= ΜA741 =

Operational amplifier

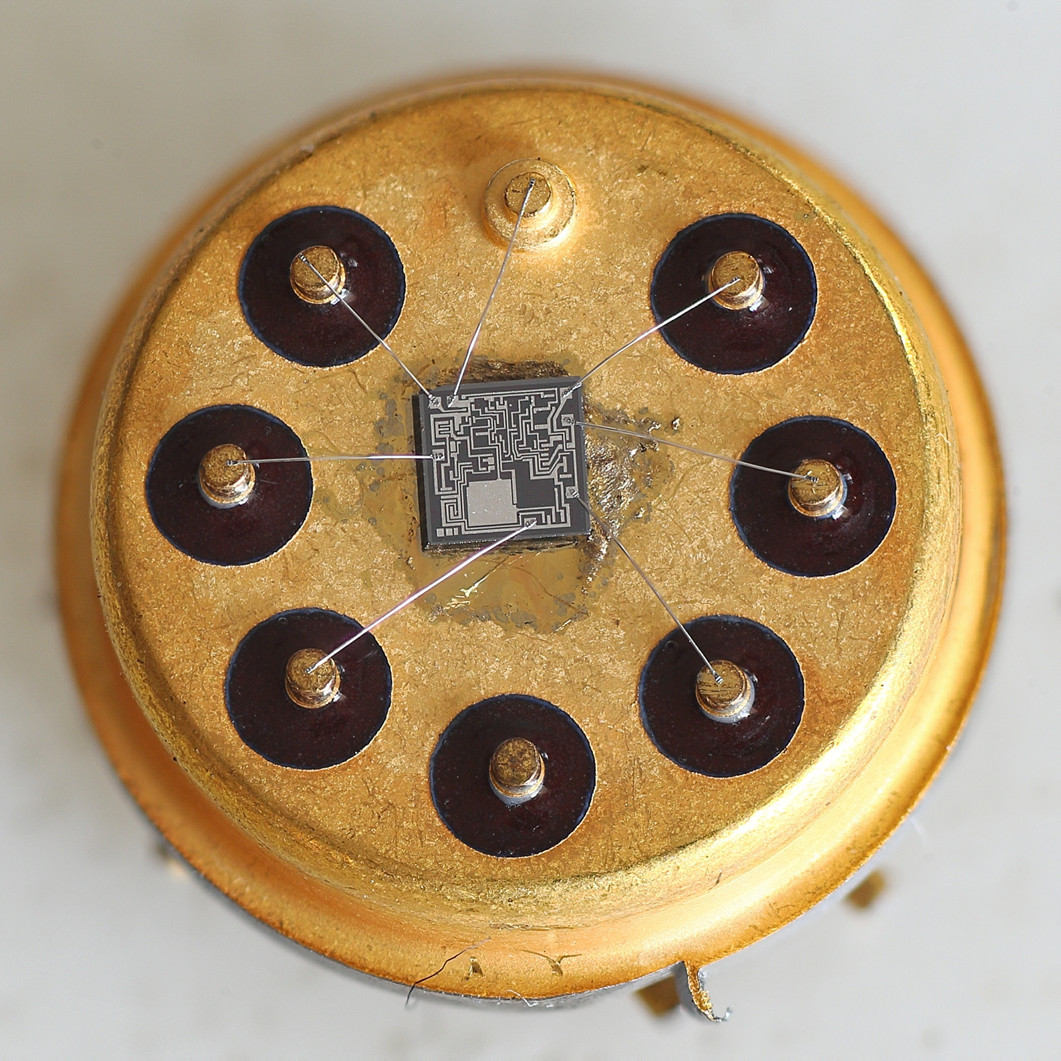
The μA741 opamp designed and manufactured by Fairchild in a round liquid molding compound package with lid removed to show the bare die and bond wires.

The μA741 is an early operational amplifier (op amp) integrated circuit (IC), originally designed at Fairchild Semiconductor by Dave Fullagar and released in 1968. It is still often used as an educational example, especially for imperfections that an operational amplifier can have, and due to its long history of production of compatible and architecturally near-identical ICs under similar names (LM741, UA741, etc.). Being inferior in every aspect compared to modern op amps, applications are restricted to legacy and high-volume use cases where a relatively high-voltage supply is available anyways.

== History ==
After the successful release of a monolithic opamp IC, the Bob Widlar-designed μA702 in 1963, proved that commercial demand for such components was large, and after losing its designer, Fairchild Semiconductor set out to build a higher-performance opamp to compete with LMx01-series produced by National Semiconductor, which had hired Widlar.

Dave Fullagar worked to improve the output dead zone, input stage impedance and included a compensation capacitor to improve the dynamic behaviour of the opamp.

== Architecture ==
A component-level diagram of the common 741 op amp. Dotted lines outline: current mirrors; differential amplifier; class A gain stage; voltage level shifter; output stage.

The 741 op amp shares with most op amps an internal structure consisting of three gain stages:

1. Differential amplifier (outlined dark blue) — provides high differential amplification (gain), with rejection of common-mode signal, low noise, high input impedance, and drives a
2. Voltage amplifier (outlined magenta) — provides high voltage gain, a single-pole frequency roll-off, and in turn drives the
3. Output amplifier (outlined cyan and green) — provides high current gain (low output impedance), along with output current limiting, and output short-circuit protection.

Additionally, it contains current mirror (outlined red) bias circuitry and compensation capacitor (30 pF).

=== Building blocks ===
==== Differential amplifier ====
The input stage consists of a cascaded differential amplifier (outlined in dark blue) followed by a current-mirror active load. This constitutes a transconductance amplifier, turning a differential voltage signal at the bases of Q1, Q2 into a current signal into the base of Q15.

It entails two cascaded transistor pairs, satisfying conflicting requirements. The first stage consists of the matched NPN emitter follower pair Q1, Q2 that provides high input impedance. The second is the matched PNP common-base pair Q3, Q4 that eliminates the undesirable Miller effect; it drives an active load Q7 plus matched pair Q5, Q6.

That active load is implemented as a modified Wilson current mirror; its role is to convert the (differential) input current signal to a single-ended signal without the attendant 50% losses (increasing the op amp's open-loop gain by 3 dB). (Note: Widlar used this same trick in μA702 and μA709) Thus, a small-signal differential current in Q3 versus Q4 appears summed (doubled) at the base of Q15, the input of the voltage gain stage.

==== Voltage amplifier ====
The (class-A) voltage gain stage (outlined in magenta) consists of the two NPN transistors Q15 and Q19 connected in a Darlington configuration and uses the output side of the current mirror formed by Q12 and Q13 as its collector (dynamic) load to achieve its high voltage gain. The output sink transistor Q20 receives its base drive from the common collectors of Q15 and Q19; the level-shifter Q16 provides base drive for the output source transistor Q14. The transistor Q22 prevents this stage from delivering excessive current to Q20 and thus limits the output sink current.

==== Output amplifier ====
The output stage (Q14, Q20, outlined in cyan) is a Class AB amplifier. It provides an output drive with impedance of about 50 Ω, in essence, current gain. Transistor Q16 (outlined in green) provides the quiescent current for the output transistors and Q17 limits the output source current.

== Characteristics ==
=== Biasing circuits ===
Biasing circuits provide appropriate quiescent current for each stage of the op amp.

The 39 kΩ resistor connecting the diode-connected transistors Q11 and Q12, and the given supply voltage V_{S} = V_{S+} − V_{S−}, determine the current in the current mirrors, (matched pairs) Q10/Q11 and Q12/Q13. The collector current of Q11, i_{11} × 39 kΩ = V_{S} − 2V_{BE}. For the typical V_{S} = 20 V, the standing current in Q11 and Q12 (as well as in Q13) would be about 1 mA. A supply current for a typical 741 of about 2 mA agrees with the notion that these two bias currents dominate the quiescent supply current.

Transistors Q11 and Q10 form a Widlar current mirror, with quiescent current in Q10 i_{10} such that ln(i_{11}/i_{10}) = i_{10} × 5 kΩ / 28 mV, where 5 kΩ represents the emitter resistor of Q10, and 28 mV is V_{T}, the thermal voltage at room temperature. In this case i_{10} ≈ 20 μA.

==== Differential amplifier ====
The biasing circuit of this stage is set by a feedback loop that forces the collector currents of Q10 and Q9 to (nearly) match. Any small difference in these currents provides drive for the common base of Q3 and Q4. (Note: The base drive for input transistors Q1/Q2 is the input bias current and must be sourced externally.) The summed quiescent currents through Q1 and Q3 plus Q2 and Q4 is mirrored from Q8 into Q9, where it is summed with the collector current in Q10, the result being applied to the bases of Q3 and Q4.

The quiescent currents through Q1 and Q3 (also Q2 and Q4) i_{1} will thus be half of i_{10}, of order about 10 μA. Input bias current for the base of Q1 (also Q2) will amount to i_{1}/β; typically around 50 nA, implying a current gain h_{fe} ≈ 200 for Q1 (also Q2).

This feedback circuit tends to draw the common base node of Q3/Q4 to a voltage V_{com} − 2V_{BE}, where V_{com} is the input common-mode voltage. At the same time, the magnitude of the quiescent current is relatively insensitive to the characteristics of the components Q1–Q4, such as h_{fe}, that would otherwise cause temperature dependence or part-to-part variations.

Transistor Q7 drives Q5 and Q6 into conduction until their (equal) collector currents match that of Q1/Q3 and Q2/Q4. The quiescent current in Q7 is V_{BE} / 50 kΩ, about 35 μA, as is the quiescent current in Q15, with its matching operating point. Thus, the quiescent currents are pairwise matched in Q1/Q2, Q3/Q4, Q5/Q6, and Q7/Q15.

==== Voltage amplifier ====
Quiescent currents in Q16 and Q19 are set by the current mirror Q12/Q13, which is running at approximately 1 mA. The collector current in Q19 tracks that standing current.

==== Output amplifier ====
In the circuit involving Q16 (variously named rubber diode or V_{BE} multiplier), the 4.5 kΩ resistor must be conducting about 100 μA, with Q16 V_{BE} ≈ 700 mV. Then V_{CB} must be about 0.45 V, and V_{CE} ≈ 1.0 V. Because the Q16 collector is driven by a current source and the Q16 emitter drives into the Q19 collector current sink, the Q16 transistor establishes a voltage difference between the Q14 base and the Q20 base of about 1 V, regardless of the common-mode voltage of Q14/Q20 bases. The standing current in Q14/Q20 will be a factor exp(100 mV·mm/ V_{T}) ≈ 36 smaller than the 1 mA quiescent current in the class A portion of the op amp. This (small) standing current in the output transistors establishes the output stage in class AB operation and reduces the crossover distortion of this stage.

=== Small-signal differential mode ===
A small differential input voltage signal gives rise, through multiple stages of current amplification, to a much larger voltage signal on output.

==== Input impedance ====
The input stage with Q1 and Q3 is similar to an emitter-coupled pair (long-tailed pair), with Q2 and Q4 adding some degenerating impedance. The input impedance is relatively high because of the small current through Q1–Q4. A typical 741 op amp has a differential input impedance of about 2 MΩ. The common mode input impedance is even higher, as the input stage works at an essentially constant current.

==== Differential amplifier ====
A differential voltage V_{in} at the op amp inputs (pins 3 and 2, respectively) gives rise to a small differential current in the bases of Q1 and Q2 i_{in} ≈ V_{in} / (2h_{ie}h_{fe}). This differential base current causes a change in the differential collector current in each leg by i_{in}h_{fe}. Introducing the transconductance of Q1, g_{m}h_{fe} / h_{ie}, the (small-signal) current at the base of Q15 (the input of the voltage gain stage) is V_{in}g_{m} / 2.

This portion of the op amp cleverly changes a differential signal at the op amp inputs to a single-ended signal at the base of Q15, and in a way that avoids wastefully discarding the signal in either leg. To see how, notice that a small negative change in voltage at the inverting input (Q2 base) drives it out of conduction, and this incremental decrease in current passes directly from Q4 collector to its emitter, resulting in a decrease in base drive for Q15. On the other hand, a small positive change in voltage at the non-inverting input (Q1 base) drives this transistor into conduction, reflected in an increase in current at the collector of Q3. This current drives Q7 further into conduction, which turns on current mirror Q5/Q6. Thus, the increase in Q3 emitter current is mirrored in an increase in Q6 collector current; the increased collector currents shunts more from the collector node and results in a decrease in base drive current for Q15. Besides avoiding wasting 3 dB of gain here, this technique decreases common-mode gain and feedthrough of power supply noise.

==== Voltage amplifier ====
A current signal i at Q15's base gives rise to a current in Q19 of order iβ^{2} (the product of the h_{fe} of each of Q15 and Q19, which are connected in a Darlington pair). This current signal develops a voltage at the bases of output transistors Q14 and Q20 proportional to the h_{ie} of the respective transistor.

==== Output amplifier ====
Output transistors Q14 and Q20 are each configured as an emitter follower, so no voltage gain occurs there; instead, this stage provides current gain, equal to the h_{fe} of Q14 and Q20.

The current gain lowers the output impedance and although the output impedance is not zero, as it would be in an ideal op amp, with negative feedback, it approaches zero at low frequencies.

=== Other linear characteristics ===
==== Overall open-loop gain ====
The net open-loop small-signal voltage gain of the op amp is determined by the product of the current gain h_{fe} of some 4 transistors. In practice, the voltage gain for a typical 741-style op amp is of order 200,000, and the current gain, the ratio of input impedance (about 2–6 MΩ) to output impedance (around 50 Ω) provides yet more (power) gain.

==== Small-signal common mode gain ====
The ideal op amp has infinite common-mode rejection ratio, or zero common-mode gain.

In the present circuit, if the input voltages change in the same direction, the negative feedback makes Q3/Q4 base voltage follow (with 2V_{BE} below) the input voltage variations. Now the output part (Q10) of Q10–Q11 current mirror keeps up the common current through Q9/Q8 constant in spite of varying voltage. Q3/Q4 collector currents, and accordingly the output current at the base of Q15, remain unchanged.

In the typical 741 op amp, the common-mode rejection ratio is 90 dB, implying an open-loop common-mode voltage gain of about 6.

==== Frequency compensation ====
The innovation of the Fairchild μA741 was the introduction of frequency compensation via an on-chip (monolithic) capacitor, simplifying application of the op amp by eliminating the need for external components for this function. The 30 pF capacitor stabilizes the amplifier via Miller compensation and functions in a manner similar to an op-amp integrator circuit. Also known as dominant pole compensation because it introduces a pole that masks (dominates) the effects of other poles into the open loop frequency response; in a 741 op amp this pole can be as low as 10 Hz (where it causes a −3 dB loss of open loop voltage gain).

This internal compensation is provided to achieve unconditional stability of the amplifier in negative feedback configurations where the feedback network is non-reactive and the loop gain is unity or higher. In contrast, amplifiers requiring external compensation, such as the μA748, may require external compensation or closed-loop gains significantly higher than unity.

==== Input offset voltage ====
The offset null pins may be used to place external resistors (typically in the form of the two ends of a potentiometer, with the slider connected to V_{S–}) in parallel with the emitter resistors of Q5 and Q6, to adjust the balance of the Q5/Q6 current mirror. The potentiometer is adjusted such that the output is null (midrange) when the inputs are shorted together.

=== Non-linear characteristics ===
==== Input breakdown voltage ====
The transistors Q3, Q4 help to increase the reverse V_{BE} rating; The base-emitter junctions of the NPN transistors Q1 and Q2 break down at around 7 V, but the PNP transistors Q3 and Q4 have V_{BE} breakdown voltages around 50 V.

==== Output-stage voltage swing and current limiting ====
Variations in the quiescent current with temperature, or due to manufacturing variations, are common, so crossover distortion may be subject to significant variation.

The output range of the amplifier is about one volt less than the supply voltage, owing in part to V_{BE} of the output transistors Q14 and Q20.

The 25 Ω resistor at the Q14 emitter, along with Q17, limits Q14 current to about 25 mA; otherwise, Q17 conducts no current. Current limiting for Q20 is performed in the voltage gain stage: Q22 senses the voltage across Q19's emitter resistor (50 Ω); as it turns on, it diminishes the drive current to Q15 base. Later versions of this amplifier schematic may show a somewhat different method of output current limiting.

== Applicability ==
While the 741 was historically used in audio and other sensitive equipment, such use is now rare because of the improved noise performance of more modern op amps. Apart from generating noticeable hiss, 741s and other older op amps may have poor common-mode rejection ratios and so will often introduce cable-borne mains hum and other common-mode interference, such as switch "clicks", into sensitive equipment.

The '741' has come to often mean a generic op-amp IC (such as μA741, LM301, 558, LM324, TBA221 — or a more modern replacement such as the TL071). The description of the 741 output stage is qualitatively similar for many other designs (that may have quite different input stages), except:

- Some devices (μA748, LM301, LM308) are not internally compensated. Hence, they provide a pin for wiring an external capacitor from output to some point within the operational amplifier, if used in low closed-loop gain applications.
- Some modern devices have rail-to-rail output capability, meaning that the output can range from within a few millivolts of the positive supply voltage to within a few millivolts of the negative supply voltage.
