= Widlar current source =

Electronic circuit

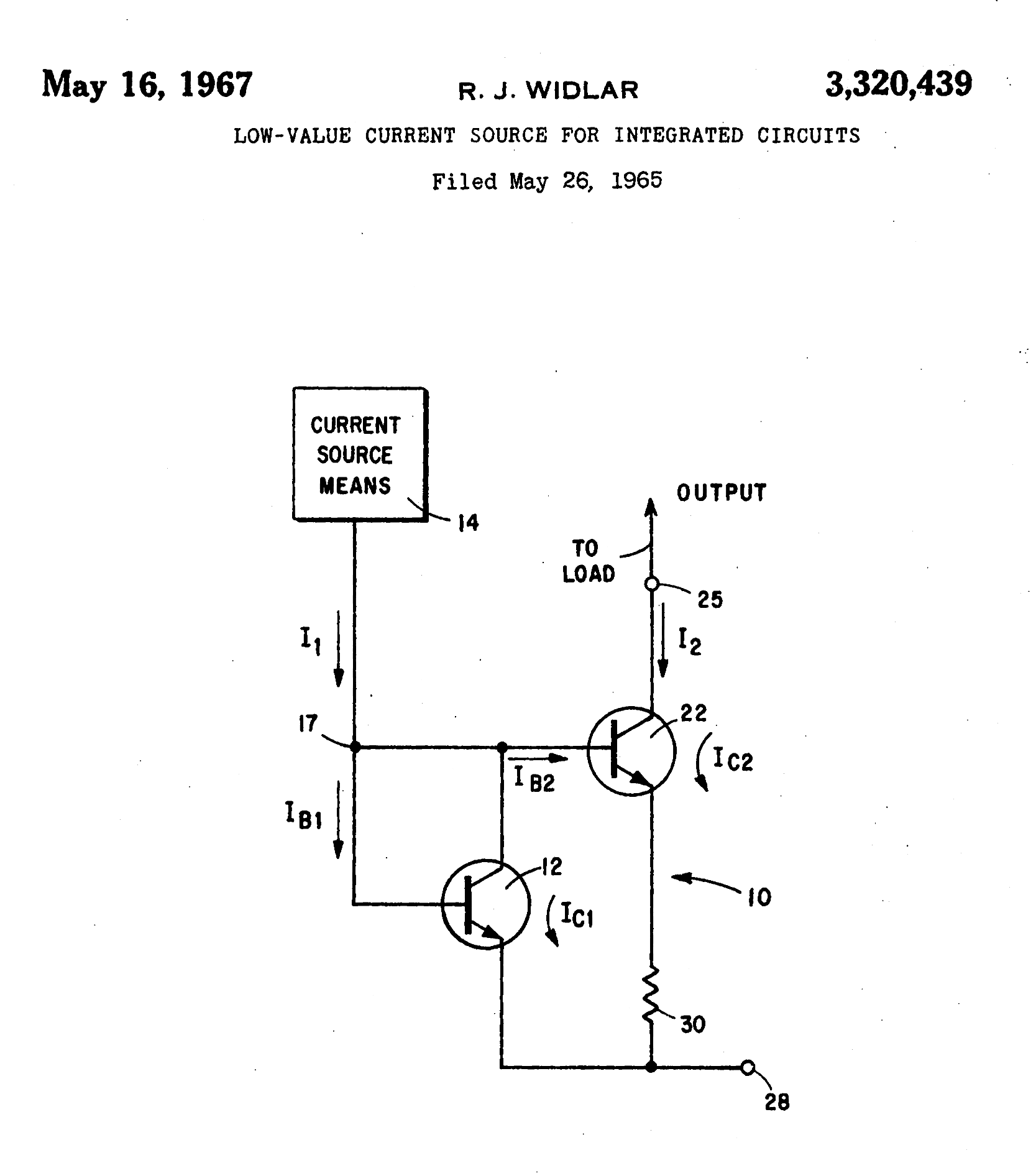
Diagram from Widlar's original patent

A Widlar current source is a modification of the basic two-transistor current mirror that incorporates an emitter degeneration resistor for only the output transistor, enabling the current source to generate low currents using only moderate resistor values.

The Widlar circuit may be used with bipolar transistors, MOS transistors, and even vacuum tubes. An example application is the 741 operational amplifier, and Widlar used the circuit as a part in many designs.

This circuit is named after its inventor, Bob Widlar, and was patented in 1967.

== DC analysis ==
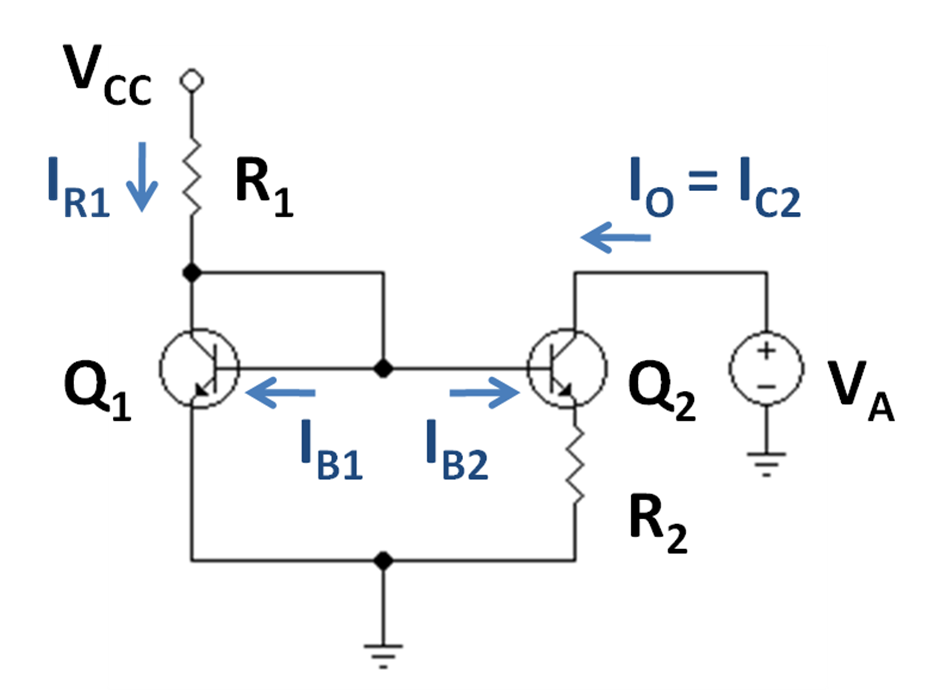
Figure 1: A version of the Widlar current source using bipolar transistors.

Figure 1 is an example Widlar current source using bipolar transistors, where the emitter resistance R_{2} is connected to the output transistor Q_{2}, and has the effect of reducing the current in Q_{2} relative to Q_{1}. The key to this circuit is that the voltage drop across the resistance R_{2} subtracts from the base-emitter voltage of transistor Q_{2}, thereby turning this transistor off compared to transistor Q_{1}. This observation is expressed by equating the base voltage expressions found on either side of the circuit in Figure 1 as:

$$\begin{align}
&V_\text{B} = V_\text{BE1} = V_\text{BE2} + (\beta_2 + 1)I_\text{B2}R_2 \\
\Rightarrow {} &\frac{1}{R_2}\left(V_\text{BE1} - V_\text{BE2}\right) = (\beta_2 + 1)I_\text{B2}\ ,
\end{align}$$

where β_{2} is the beta-value of the output transistor, which is not the same as that of the input transistor, in part because the currents in the two transistors are very different. The variable I_{B2} is the base current of the output transistor, V_{BE} refers to base-emitter voltage. This equation implies (using the Shockley diode equation):

Eq. 1

$$\begin{align}
(\beta_2 + 1)I_\text{B2} &= \left(1 + \frac{1}{\beta_2} \right) I_\text{C2} = \frac{1}{R_2} \left(V_\text{BE1} - V_\text{BE2}\right) \\
&= \frac{V_\text{T}}{R_2} \left[ \ln\left(I_\text{C1}/I_\text{S1}\right) - \ln\left(I_\text{C2}/I_\text{S2}\right) \right] = \frac{V_\text{T}}{R_2} \ln \left(\frac{I_\text{C1}I_\text{S2}}{I_\text{C2}I_\text{S1}}\right)\ ,
\end{align}$$

where V_{T} is the thermal voltage.

This equation makes the approximation that the currents are both much larger than the scale currents, I_{S1} and I_{S2}; an approximation valid except for current levels near cut off. In the following, the scale currents are assumed to be identical; in practice, this needs to be specifically arranged.

== Design procedure with specified currents ==
To design the mirror, the output current must be related to the two resistor values R_{1} and R_{2}. A basic observation is that the output transistor is in active mode only so long as its collector-base voltage is non-zero. Thus, the simplest bias condition for design of the mirror sets the applied voltage V_{A} to equal the base voltage V_{B}. This minimum useful value of V_{A} is called the compliance voltage of the current source. With that bias condition, the Early effect plays no role in the design.

These considerations suggest the following design procedure:

- Select the desired output current, I_{O} = I_{C2}.
- Select the reference current, I_{R1}, assumed to be larger than the output current, probably considerably larger (that is the purpose of the circuit).
- Determine the input collector current of Q_{1}, I_{C1}:
  $$I_\text{C1} = \frac{\beta_1}{\beta_1+1} \left( I_\text{R1} - \frac{I_\text{C2}}{\beta_2} \right)\ .$$
- Determine the base voltage V_{BE1} using the Shockley diode law
  $$V_\text{BE1} = V_\text{T} \ln \left(\frac{I_\text{C1}} {I_\text{S}} \right) = V_\text{A}\ .$$

where I_{S} is a device parameter sometimes called the scale current.
The value of base voltage also sets the compliance voltage V_{A} = V_{BE1}. This voltage is the lowest voltage for which the mirror works properly.

- Determine R_{1}:
  $$R_1 = \frac {V_\text{CC} - V_\text{A}}{I_\text{R1}}\ .$$
- Determine the emitter leg resistance R_{2} using Eq. 1 (to reduce clutter, the scale currents are chosen equal):
  $$R_2 = \frac{V_\text{T}}{\left(1 + \frac{1}{\beta_2} \right) I_\text{C2}} \ln \left(\frac {I_\text{C1}}{I_\text{C2}}\right)\ .$$

== Finding the current with given resistor values ==
The inverse of the design problem is finding the current when the resistor values are known. An iterative method is described next. Assume the current source is biased so the collector-base voltage of the output transistor Q_{2} is zero. The current through R_{1} is the input or reference current given as,

$$\begin{align}
I_\text{R1} &= I_\text{C1} + I_\text{B1} + I_\text{B2} \\
&= I_\text{C1} + \frac{I_\text{C1}}{\beta_1} + \frac{I_\text{C2}}{\beta_2} \\
&= \frac{1}{R_1} \left(V_\text{CC} - V_\text{BE1}\right)
\end{align}$$

Rearranging, I_{C1} is found as:

Eq. 2

$$I_\text{C1} = \frac{\beta_1}{\beta_1 + 1} \left( \frac{V_\text{CC} - V_\text{BE1}}{R_1} - \frac{I_\text{C2}}{\beta_2} \right)$$

The diode equation provides:

Eq. 3

$$V_\text{BE1} = V_\text{T} \ln \left( \frac{I_\text{C1}}{I_\text{S1}}\right) \ .$$

Eq.1 provides:

$$I_\text{C2}  = \frac{V_\text{T}}{\left(1 + \frac{1}{\beta_2} \right) R_2} \ln \left(\frac {I_\text{C1}}{I_\text{C2}}\right)\ .$$

These three relations are a nonlinear, implicit determination for the currents that can be solved by iteration.

- We guess starting values for I_{C1} and I_{C2}.
- We find a value for V_{BE1}:
  $$V_\text{BE1} = V_\text{T} \ln \left( \frac{I_\text{C1}}{I_\text{S1}}\right) \ .$$
- We find a new value for I_{C1}:
  $$I_\text{C1} = \frac{\beta_1}{\beta_1 + 1} \left( \frac {V_\text{CC} - V_\text{BE1}}{R_1} - \frac{I_\text{C2}}{\beta_2} \right)$$
- We find a new value for I_{C2}:
  $$I_\text{C2}  = \frac{V_\text{T}}{\left(1 + \frac{1}{\beta_2} \right) R_2} \ln \left(\frac{I_\text{C1}}{I_\text{C2}}\right)\ .$$

This procedure is repeated to convergence, and is set up conveniently in a spreadsheet. One simply uses a macro to copy the values into the spreadsheet cells holding the initial values to obtain the solution in short order.

Note that with the circuit as shown, if V_{CC} changes, the output current will change. Hence, to keep the output current constant despite fluctuations in V_{CC}, the circuit should be driven by a constant current source rather than using the resistor R_{1}.

=== Exact solution ===
The transcendental equations above can be solved exactly in terms of the Lambert W function.

== Output impedance ==
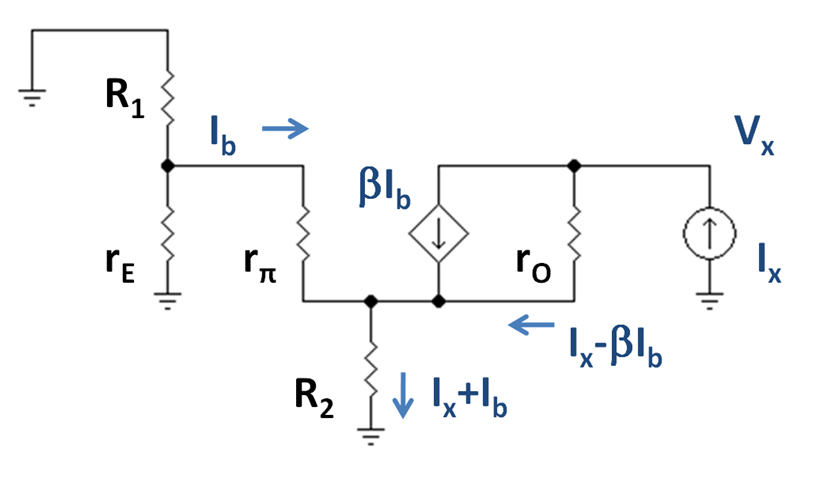
Figure 2: Small-signal circuit for finding output resistance of the Widlar source shown in Figure 1. A test current I_{x} is applied at the output, and the output resistance is then R_{O} = V_{x} / I_{x}.

An important property of a current source is its small signal incremental output impedance, which should ideally be infinite. The Widlar circuit introduces local current feedback for transistor $\scriptstyle Q_{2}$. Any increase in the current in Q_{2} increases the voltage drop across R_{2}, reducing the V_{BE} for Q_{2}, thereby countering the increase in current. This feedback means the output impedance of the circuit is increased, because the feedback involving R_{2} forces use of a larger voltage to drive a given current.

Output resistance is found using a small-signal model for the circuit, shown in Figure 2. Transistor Q_{1} is replaced by its small-signal emitter resistance r_{E} because it is diode connected. Transistor Q_{2} is replaced with its hybrid-pi model. A test current I_{x} is attached at the output.

Using the figure, the output resistance is determined using Kirchhoff's laws. Using Kirchhoff's voltage law from the ground on the left to the ground connection of R_{2}:

$$I_\text{b} \left[ ( R_1 \parallel r_\text{E} ) + r_\pi \right] + [I_\text{x} + I_\text{b}] R_2 = 0 \ .$$

Rearranging:

$$I_\text{b} = -I_\text{x} \frac{R_2}{( R_1 \parallel r_\text{E} ) + r_\pi + R_2} \ .$$

Using Kirchhoff's voltage law from the ground connection of R_{2} to the ground of the test current:

$$V_\text{x} = I_\text{x} (R_2 + r_\text{O}) + I_\text{b} (R_2 - \beta r_\text{O})\ ,$$

or, substituting for I_{b}:

Eq. 4

$R_\text{O} = \frac{V_\text{x}}{I_\text{x}} = r_\text{O} \left[ 1 + \frac{\beta R_2}{( R_1 \parallel r_\text{E} ) + r_\pi + R_2} \right]$ $+ \ R_2 \left[ \frac{( R_1 \parallel r_\text{E} ) + r_\pi}{( R_1 \parallel r_\text{E} ) + r_\pi + R_2} \right] \ .$

According to Eq. 4, the output resistance of the Widlar current source is increased over that of the output transistor itself (which is r_{O}) so long as R_{2} is large enough compared to the r_{π} of the output transistor (large resistances R_{2} make the factor multiplying r_{O} approach the value (β + 1)). The output transistor carries a low current, making r_{π} large, and increase in R_{2} tends to reduce this current further, causing a correlated increase in r_{π}. Therefore, a goal of R_{2} ≫ r_{π} can be unrealistic, and further discussion is provided below. The resistance R_{1}∥r_{E} usually is small because the emitter resistance r_{E} usually is only a few ohms.

=== Current dependence of output resistance ===
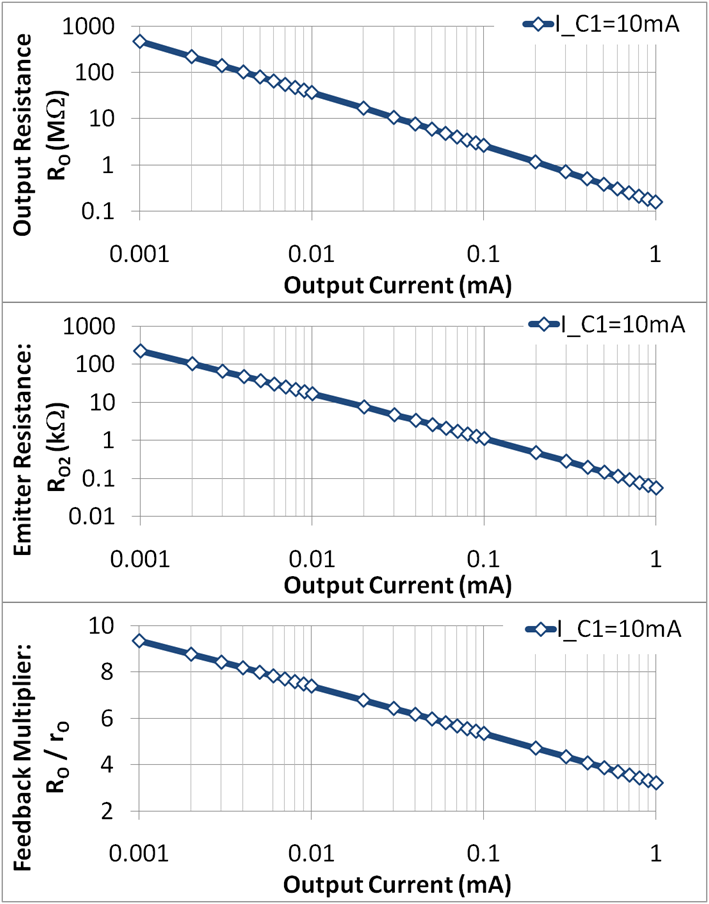
Figure 3: Design trade-off between output resistance and output current. Top panel: Circuit output resistance R_{O} vs. DC output current I_{C2} using the design formula of Eq. 5 for R_{2} ; Center panel: Resistance R_{O2} in output transistor emitter leg; Bottom panel: Feedback factor contributing to output resistance. Current in the reference transistor Q_{1} is held constant, thereby fixing the compliance voltage. Plots assume I_{C1} = 10 mA, V_{A} = 50 V, V_{CC} = 5 V, I_{S} = 10 fA, β_{1,} = 100 independently of current.

The current dependence of the resistances r_{π} and r_{O} is discussed in the article hybrid-pi model. The current dependence of the resistor values is:

$$r_\pi = \frac{v_\text{be}}{i_\text{b}}\Bigg|_{v_\text{ce} = 0} = \frac{V_\text{T}}{I_\text{B2}} = \beta_2\frac{V_\text{T}}{I_\text{C2}}\ ,$$

and

$$r_\text{O} = \frac{v_\text{ce}}{i_\text{c}}\Bigg|_{v_\text{be} = 0} = \frac {V_\text{A}}{I_\text{C2}}$$

is the output resistance due to the Early effect when V_{CB} = 0 V (device parameter V_{A} is the Early voltage).

From earlier in this article (setting the scale currents equal for convenience): Eq. 5

$$R_2 = \frac{V_\text{T}}{\left(1 + \frac{1}{\beta_2} \right) I_\text{C2}} \ln \left(\frac {I_\text{C1}}{I_\text{C2}}\right)\ .$$

Consequently, for the usual case of small r_{E}, and neglecting the second term in R_{O} with the expectation that the leading term involving r_{O} is much larger: Eq. 6

$$\begin{align}
R_\text{O} &\approx r_\text{O} \left( 1 + \frac{\beta_2 R_2}{r_\pi + R_2} \right) \\
&= r_\text{O} \left( 1 + \frac{\beta_2 \ln \left(\frac{I_\text{C1}}{I_\text{C2}}\right)}{\beta_2 + 1 + \ln \left(\frac {I_\text{C1}}{I_\text{C2}}\right)} \right)
\end{align}$$

where the last form is found by substituting Eq. 5 for R_{2}. Eq. 6 shows that a value of output resistance much larger than r_{O} of the output transistor results only for designs with I_{C1} >> I_{C2}. Figure 3 shows that the circuit output resistance R_{O} is not determined so much by feedback as by the current dependence of the resistance r_{O} of the output transistor (the output resistance in Figure 3 varies four orders of magnitude, while the feedback factor varies only by one order of magnitude).

Increase of I_{C1} to increase the feedback factor also results in increased compliance voltage, not a good thing as that means the current source operates over a more restricted voltage range. So, for example, with a goal for compliance voltage set, placing an upper limit upon I_{C1}, and with a goal for output resistance to be met, the maximum value of output current I_{C2} is limited.

The center panel in Figure 3 shows the design trade-off between emitter leg resistance and the output current: a lower output current requires a larger leg resistor, and hence a larger area for the design. An upper bound on area therefore sets a lower bound on the output current and an upper bound on the circuit output resistance.

Eq. 6 for R_{O} depends upon selecting a value of R_{2} according to Eq. 5. That means Eq. 6 is not a circuit behavior formula, but a design value equation. Once R_{2} is selected for a particular design objective using Eq. 5, thereafter its value is fixed. If circuit operation causes currents, voltages or temperatures to deviate from the designed-for values; then to predict changes in R_{O} caused by such deviations, Eq. 4 should be used, not Eq. 6.

== See also ==
- Current source
- Current mirror
- Wilson current source
