= Current mirror =

Circuit designed to copy a current through one active device

A current mirror is a circuit designed to copy a current through one active device by controlling the current in another active device of a circuit, keeping the output current constant regardless of loading. The current being "copied" can be, and sometimes is, a varying signal current. Conceptually, an ideal current mirror is simply an ideal inverting current amplifier that reverses the current direction as well, or it could consist of a current-controlled current source (CCCS). The current mirror is used to provide bias currents and active loads to circuits. It can also be used to model a more realistic current source (since ideal current sources do not exist).

The circuit topology covered here is one that appears in many monolithic integrated circuits (ICs). It is a Widlar mirror without an emitter degeneration resistor in the follower (output) transistor. This topology can only be done in an IC, as the matching has to be extremely close and cannot be achieved with discretes.

Another topology is the Wilson current mirror. The Wilson mirror solves the Early effect voltage problem in this design.

Current mirrors are applied in both analog and mixed VLSI circuits.

== Mirror characteristics ==
There are three main specifications that characterize a current mirror. The first is the transfer ratio (in the case of a current amplifier) or the output current magnitude (in the case of a constant current source CCS). The second is its AC output resistance, which determines how much the output current varies with the voltage applied to the mirror. The third specification is the minimum voltage drop across the output part of the mirror necessary to make it work properly. This minimum voltage is dictated by the need to keep the output transistor of the mirror in active mode. The range of voltages where the mirror works is called the compliance range and the voltage marking the boundary between good and bad behavior is called the compliance voltage. There are also a number of secondary performance issues with mirrors, for example, temperature stability.

== Practical approximations ==
For small-signal analysis the current mirror can be approximated by its equivalent Norton impedance.

In large-signal hand analysis, a current mirror is usually and simply approximated by an ideal current source. However, an ideal current source is unrealistic in several respects:

- it has infinite AC impedance, while a practical mirror has finite impedance
- it provides the same current regardless of voltage, that is, there are no compliance range requirements
- it has no frequency limitations, while a real mirror has limitations due to the parasitic capacitances of the transistors
- the ideal source has no sensitivity to real-world effects like noise, power-supply voltage variations and component tolerances.

== Circuit realizations of current mirrors ==
=== Basic idea ===
A bipolar transistor can be used as the simplest current-to-current converter but its transfer ratio would highly depend on temperature variations, β tolerances, etc. To eliminate these undesired disturbances, a current mirror is composed of two cascaded current-to-voltage and voltage-to-current converters placed at the same conditions and having reverse characteristics. It is not obligatory for them to be linear; the only requirement is their characteristics to be mirrorlike (for example, in the BJT current mirror below, they are logarithmic and exponential). Usually, two identical converters are used but the characteristic of the first one is reversed by applying a negative feedback. Thus a current mirror consists of two cascaded equal converters (the first – reversed and the second – direct).

Figure 1: A current mirror implemented with n–p–n bipolar transistors using a resistor to set the reference current I_{REF}; V_{CC} is a positive voltage.

=== Basic BJT current mirror ===
If a voltage is applied to the BJT base-emitter junction as an input quantity and the collector current is taken as an output quantity, the transistor will act as an exponential voltage-to-current converter. By applying a negative feedback (simply joining the base and collector) the transistor can be "reversed" and it will begin acting as the opposite logarithmic current-to-voltage converter; now it will adjust the "output" base-emitter voltage so as to pass the applied "input" collector current.

The simplest bipolar current mirror (shown in Figure 1) implements this idea. It consists of two cascaded transistor stages acting accordingly as a reversed and direct voltage-to-current converters. The emitter of transistor Q_{1} is connected to ground. Its collector and base are tied together, so its collector-base voltage is zero. Consequently, the voltage drop across Q_{1} is V_{BE}, that is, this voltage is set by the diode law and Q_{1} is said to be diode connected. (See also Ebers-Moll model.) It is important to have Q_{1} in the circuit instead of a simple diode, because Q_{1} sets V_{BE} for transistor Q_{2}. If Q_{1} and Q_{2} are matched, that is, have substantially the same device properties, and if the mirror output voltage is chosen so the collector-base voltage of Q_{2} is also zero, then the V_{BE}-value set by Q_{1} results in an emitter current in the matched Q_{2} that is the same as the emitter current in Q_{1}. Because Q_{1} and Q_{2} are matched, their β_{0}-values also agree, making the mirror output current the same as the collector current of Q_{1}.

The current delivered by the mirror for arbitrary collector-base reverse bias, V_{CB}, of the output transistor is given by:

$$I_\text{C} = I_\text{S} \left( e^{\frac{V_\text{BE}}{V_\text{T}}} - 1 \right) \left(1 + \frac{V_\text{CE}}{V_\text{A}}\right),$$

where I_{S} is the reverse saturation current or scale current; V_{T}, the thermal voltage; and V_{A}, the Early voltage. This current is related to the reference current I_{ref} when the output transistor V_{CB} = 0 V by:

$$I_\text{ref} = I_C \left( 1 + \frac{2}{\beta_0} \right),$$

as found using Kirchhoff's current law at the collector node of Q_{1}:

$$I_\text{ref} = I_C + I_{B1} + I_{B2} \ .$$

The reference current supplies the collector current to Q_{1} and the base currents to both transistors – when both transistors have zero base-collector bias, the two base currents are equal, I_{B1} = I_{B2} = I_{B}.

$$I_\text{ref} = I_C + I_B + I_B = I_C + 2 I_B = I_C \left(1 + \frac {2} {\beta_0} \right),$$

Parameter β_{0} is the transistor β-value for V_{CB} = 0 V.

==== Output resistance ====
If V_{BC} is greater than zero in output transistor Q_{2}, the collector current in Q_{2} will be somewhat larger than for Q_{1} due to the Early effect. In other words, the mirror has a finite output (or Norton) resistance given by the r_{o} of the output transistor, namely:

$$R_N = r_o = \frac{V_A + V_{CE}}{I_C} \ ,$$

where V_{A} is the Early voltage; and V_{CE}, the collector-to-emitter voltage of output transistor.

==== Compliance voltage ====
To keep the output transistor active, V_{CB} ≥ 0 V. That means the lowest output voltage that results in correct mirror behavior, the compliance voltage, is V_{OUT} = V_{CV} = V_{BE} under bias conditions with the output transistor at the output current level I_{C} and with V_{CB} = 0 V or, inverting the I–V relation above:

$$V_{CV} = V_T \ln\left(\frac{I_C}{I_S} + 1\right),$$

where V_{T} is the thermal voltage; and I_{S}, the reverse saturation current or scale current.

==== Extensions and complications ====
When Q_{2} has V_{CB} > 0 V, the transistors no longer are matched. In particular, their β-values differ due to the Early effect, with

$$\begin{align}
\beta_1 &= \beta_0 \\
\beta_2 &= \beta_0 \left(1 + \frac{V_{CB}}{V_A}\right),
\end{align}$$

where V_{A} is the Early voltage and β_{0} is the transistor β for V_{CB} = 0 V. Besides the difference due to the Early effect, the transistor β-values will differ because the β_{0}-values depend on current, and the two transistors now carry different currents (see Gummel–Poon model).

Further, Q_{2} may get substantially hotter than Q_{1} due to the associated higher power dissipation. To maintain matching, the temperature of the transistors must be nearly the same. In integrated circuits and transistor arrays where both transistors are on the same die, this is easy to achieve. But if the two transistors are widely separated, the precision of the current mirror is compromised.

Additional matched transistors can be connected to the same base and will supply the same collector current. In other words, the right half of the circuit can be duplicated several times. Note, however, that each additional right-half transistor "steals" a bit of collector current from Q_{1} due to the non-zero base currents of the right-half transistors. This will result in a small reduction in the programmed current.

See also an example of a mirror with emitter degeneration to increase mirror resistance.

For the simple mirror shown in the diagram, typical values of $\beta$ will yield a current match of 1% or better.

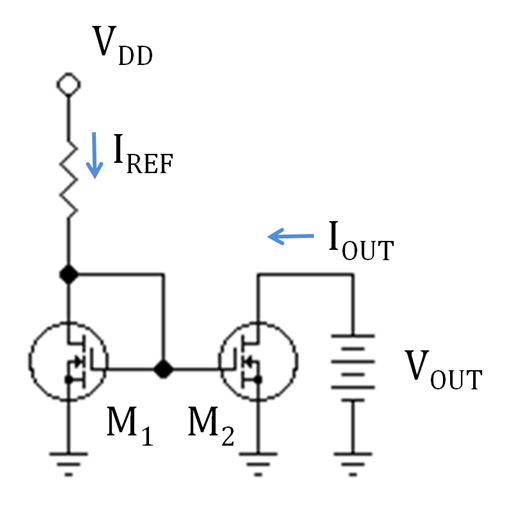
Figure 2: An n-channel MOSFET current mirror with a resistor to set the reference current I_{REF}; V_{DD} is positive voltage.

=== Basic MOSFET current mirror ===
The basic current mirror can also be implemented using MOSFET transistors, as shown in Figure 2. Transistor M_{1} is operating in the saturation or active mode, and so is M_{2}. In this setup, the output current I_{OUT} is directly related to I_{REF}, as discussed next.

The drain current of a MOSFET I_{D} is a function of both the gate-source voltage and the drain-to-gate voltage of the MOSFET given by I_{D} = f(V_{GS}, V_{DG}), a relationship derived from the functionality of the MOSFET device. In the case of transistor M_{1} of the mirror, I_{D} = I_{REF}. Reference current I_{REF} is a known current, and can be provided by a resistor as shown, or by a "threshold-referenced" or "self-biased" current source to ensure that it is constant, independent of voltage supply variations.

Using V_{DG} = 0 for transistor M_{1}, the drain current in M_{1} is I_{D} = f(V_{GS}, V_{DG}=0), so we find: f(V_{GS}, 0) = I_{REF}, implicitly determining the value of V_{GS}. Thus I_{REF} sets the value of V_{GS}. The circuit in the diagram forces the same V_{GS} to apply to transistor M_{2}. If M_{2} is also biased with zero V_{DG} and provided transistors M_{1} and M_{2} have good matching of their properties, such as channel length, width, threshold voltage, etc., the relationship I_{OUT} = f(V_{GS}, V_{DG} = 0) applies, thus setting I_{OUT} = I_{REF}; that is, the output current is the same as the reference current when V_{DG} = 0 for the output transistor, and both transistors are matched.

The drain-to-source voltage can be expressed as V_{DS} = V_{DG} + V_{GS}. With this substitution, the Shichman–Hodges model provides an approximate form for function f(V_{GS}, V_{DG}):

$$\begin{align}
I_\text{d} &= f(V_\text{GS}, V_\text{DG}) \\
&= \frac{1}{2} K_\text{p} \left(\frac{W}{L}\right)\left(V_\text{GS} - V_\text{th}\right)^2 \left(1 + \lambda V_\text{DS}\right) \\
&= \frac{1}{2} K_\text{p} \left[\frac{W}{L}\right]\left[V_\text{GS} - V_\text{th}\right]^2 \left[1 + \lambda (V_\text{DG} + V_\text{GS})\right] , \\
\end{align}$$

where $K_\text{p}$ is a technology-related constant associated with the transistor, W/L is the width to length ratio of the transistor, $V_\text{GS}$ is the gate-source voltage, $V_\text{th}$ is the threshold voltage, λ is the channel length modulation constant, and $V_{DS}$ is the drain-source voltage.

==== Output resistance ====
Because of channel-length modulation, the mirror has a finite output (or Norton) resistance given by the r_{o} of the output transistor, namely (see channel length modulation):

$$R_\text{N} = r_\text{o} = \frac{1}{I_\text{D}}\left(\frac{1}{\lambda}r + V_\text{DS}\right) = \frac{1}{I_\text{D}}\left(V_\text{E} L + V_\text{DS}\right),$$

where λ = channel-length modulation parameter and V_{DS} is the drain-to-source bias.

==== Compliance voltage ====
To keep the output transistor resistance high, V_{DG} ≥ 0 V. (Note: Keeping the output resistance high means more than keeping the MOSFET in active mode, because the output resistance of real MOSFETs only begins to increase on entry into the active region, then rising to become close to maximum value only when V_{DG} ≥ 0 V.) (see Baker). That means the lowest output voltage that results in correct mirror behavior, the compliance voltage, is V_{OUT} = V_{CV} = V_{GS} for the output transistor at the output current level with V_{DG} = 0 V, or using the inverse of the f-function, f^{−1}:

$$V_\text{CV} = V_\text{GS} (\text{for}\ I_\text{D}\ \text{at} \ V_\text{DG} = 0V) = f^{-1}(I_\text{D}) \ \text{with}\ V_\text{DG} = 0 \ .$$

For the Shichman–Hodges model, f^{−1} is approximately a square-root function.

==== Extensions and reservations ====
A useful feature of this mirror is the linear dependence of f upon device width W, a proportionality approximately satisfied even for models more accurate than the Shichman–Hodges model. Thus, by adjusting the ratio of widths of the two transistors, multiples of the reference current can be generated.

The Shichman–Hodges model is accurate only for rather dated technology, although it often is used simply for convenience even today. Any quantitative design based upon new technology uses computer models for the devices that account for the changed current-voltage characteristics. Among the differences that must be accounted for in an accurate design is the failure of the square law in V_{gs} for voltage dependence and the very poor modeling of V_{ds} drain voltage dependence provided by λV_{ds}. Another failure of the equations that proves very significant is the inaccurate dependence upon the channel length L. A significant source of L-dependence stems from λ, as noted by Gray and Meyer, who also note that λ usually must be taken from experimental data.

Due to the wide variation of V_{th} even within a particular device number discrete versions are problematic. Although the variation can be somewhat compensated for by using a Source degenerate resistor its value becomes so large that the output resistance suffers (i.e. reduces). This variation relegates the MOSFET version to the IC/monolithic arena.

=== Feedback-assisted current mirror ===
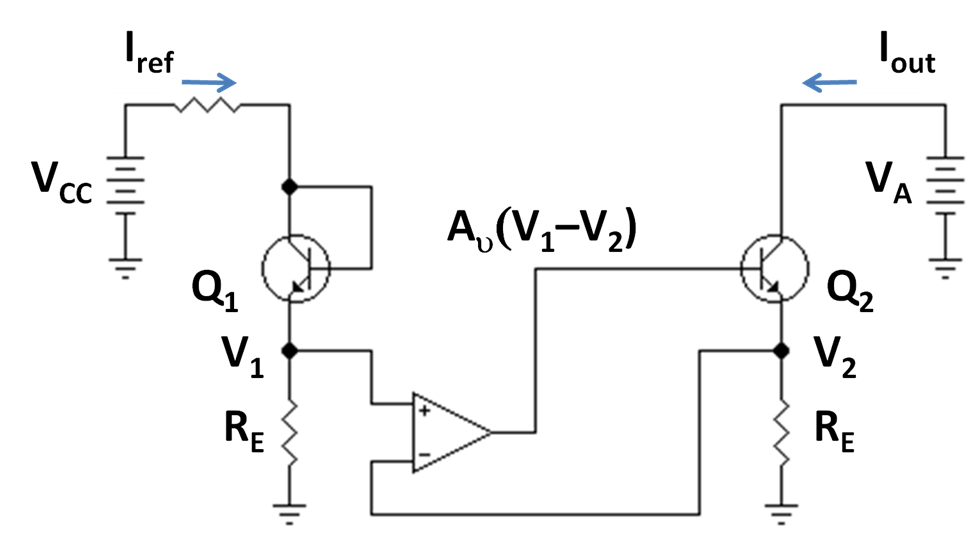
Figure 3: Gain-boosted current mirror with op-amp feedback to increase output resistance

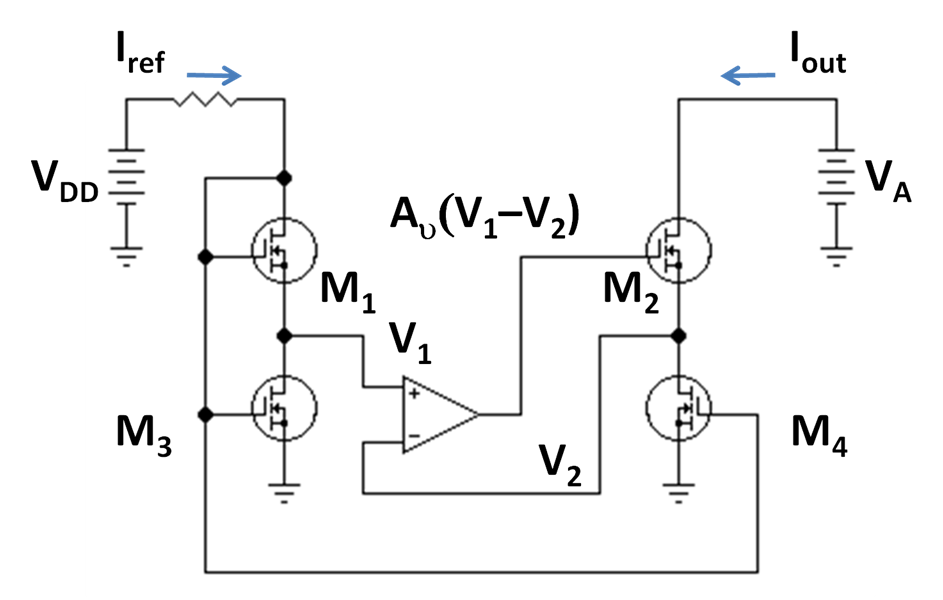
MOSFET version of gain-boosted current mirror; M_{1} and M_{2} are in active mode, while M_{3} and M_{4} are in ohmic mode and act like resistors. The operational amplifier provides feedback that maintains a high output resistance.

Figure 3 shows a mirror using negative feedback to increase output resistance. Because of the op amp, these circuits are sometimes called gain-boosted current mirrors. Because they have relatively low compliance voltages, they also are called wide-swing current mirrors. A variety of circuits based upon this idea are in use, particularly for MOSFET mirrors because MOSFETs have rather low intrinsic output resistance values. A MOSFET version of Figure 3 is shown in Figure 4, where MOSFETs M_{3} and M_{4} operate in ohmic mode to play the same role as emitter resistors R_{E} in Figure 3, and MOSFETs M_{1} and M_{2} operate in active mode in the same roles as mirror transistors Q_{1} and Q_{2} in Figure 3. An explanation follows of how the circuit in Figure 3 works.

The operational amplifier is fed the difference in voltages V_{1} − V_{2} at the top of the two emitter-leg resistors of value R_{E}. This difference is amplified by the op amp and fed to the base of output transistor Q_{2}. If the collector base reverse bias on Q_{2} is increased by increasing the applied voltage V_{A}, the current in Q_{2} increases, increasing V_{2} and decreasing the difference V_{1} − V_{2} entering the op amp. Consequently, the base voltage of Q_{2} is decreased, and V_{BE} of Q_{2} decreases, counteracting the increase in output current.

If the op-amp gain A_{v} is large, only a very small difference V_{1} − V_{2} is sufficient to generate the needed base voltage V_{B} for Q_{2}, namely

$$V_1 - V_2 = \frac{V_B}{A_v}.$$

Consequently, the currents in the two leg resistors are held nearly the same, and the output current of the mirror is very nearly the same as the collector current I_{C1} in Q_{1}, which in turn is set by the reference current as

$$I_\text{ref} = I_{C1} \left(1 + \frac{1}{\beta_1}\right),$$

where β_{1} for transistor Q_{1} and β_{2} for Q_{2} differ due to the Early effect if the reverse bias across the collector-base of Q_{2} is non-zero.

==== Output resistance ====
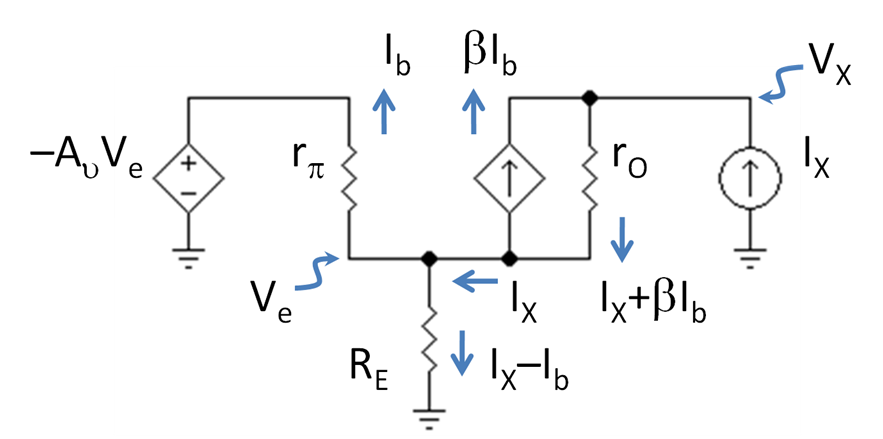
Figure 5: Small-signal circuit to determine output resistance of mirror; transistor Q_{2} is replaced with its hybrid-pi model; a test current I_{X} at the output generates a voltage V_{X}, and the output resistance is R_{out} = V_{X} / I_{X}.

An idealized treatment of output resistance is given in the footnote. (Note: An idealized version of the argument in the text, valid for infinite op amp gain, is as follows. If the op amp is replaced by a nullor, voltage V_{2} = V_{1}, so the currents in the leg resistors are held at the same value. That means the emitter currents of the transistors are the same. If the V_{CB} of Q_{2} increases, so does the output transistor β because of the Early effect: β = β_{0}(1 + V_{CB} / V_{A}). Consequently the base current to Q_{2} given by I_{B} = I_{E} / (β + 1) decreases and the output current I_{out} = I_{E} / (1 + 1 / β) increases slightly because β increases slightly. Doing the math, $$\begin{align} \frac{1}{R_\text{out}} &= \frac{\partial I_\text{out}}{\partial V_\text{CB}} = I_\text{E} \cdot \frac{\partial}{\partial V_\text{CB}} \left(\frac{\beta}{\beta + 1}\right) = I_\text{E} \cdot \frac{1}{(\beta + 1)^2} \cdot \frac{\partial\beta}{\partial V_\text{CB}} \\ &= \frac{\beta I_\text{E}}{\beta + 1} \cdot \frac{1}{\beta} \cdot \frac{\beta_0}{V_\text{A}} \cdot \frac{1}{\beta + 1} \\ &= I_\text{out} \cdot \frac{1}{1 + \frac{V_\text{CB}}{V_\text{A}}} \cdot \frac{1}{V_\text{A}} \cdot \frac{1}{\beta + 1} \\ &= \frac{1}{(\beta + 1) r_0}, \end{align}$$ where the transistor output resistance is given by r_{O} = (V_{A} + V_{CB}) / I_{out}. That is, the ideal mirror resistance for the circuit using an ideal op amp nullor is R_{out} = (β + 1c)r_{O}, in agreement with the value given later in the text when the gain → ∞.) A small-signal analysis for an op amp with finite gain A_{v} but otherwise ideal is based upon Figure 5 (β, r_{O} and r_{π} refer to Q_{2}). To arrive at Figure 5, notice that the positive input of the op amp in Figure 3 is at AC ground, so the voltage input to the op amp is simply the AC emitter voltage V_{e} applied to its negative input, resulting in a voltage output of −A_{v} V_{e}. Using Ohm's law across the input resistance r_{π} determines the small-signal base current I_{b} as:

$$I_\text{b} = \frac{V_\text{e}}\frac{r_\pi}{A_\text{v} + 1} \ .$$

Combining this result with Ohm's law for $R_\text{E}$, $V_\text{e}$ can be eliminated, to find: (Note: As A_{v} → ∞, V_{e} → 0 and I_{b} → I_{X}.)

$$I_\text{b} = I_\text{X} \frac{R_\text{E}}{ R_\text{E} + \frac{r_\pi}{A_\text{v} + 1} }.$$

Kirchhoff's voltage law from the test source I_{X} to the ground of R_{E} provides:

$$V_\text{X} = (I_\text{X} + \beta I_\text{b)} r_\text{O} + (I_\text{X} - I_\text{b} )R_\text{E}.$$

Substituting for I_{b} and collecting terms the output resistance R_{out} is found to be:

$$R_\text{out} = \frac{V_\text{X}}{I_\text{X}} = r_\text{O} \left( 1 + \beta \frac{R_\text{E}}{R_\text{E} + \frac{r_\pi}{A_\text{v} + 1}} \right) + R_\text{E} \|\frac{r_\pi}{A_\text{v} + 1}.$$

For a large gain A_{v} ≫ r_{π} / R_{E} the maximum output resistance obtained with this circuit is

$$R_\text{out} = (\beta + 1)r_O,$$

a substantial improvement over the basic mirror where R_{out} = r_{O}.

The small-signal analysis of the MOSFET circuit of Figure 4 is obtained from the bipolar analysis by setting β = g_{m} r_{π} in the formula for R_{out} and then letting r_{π} → ∞. The result is

$$R_\text{out} = r_\text{O} \left[1 + g_\text{m} R_\text{E}(A_\text{v} + 1)\right] + R_\text{E}.$$

This time, R_{E} is the resistance of the source-leg MOSFETs M_{3}, M_{4}. Unlike Figure 3, however, as A_{v} is increased (holding R_{E} fixed in value), R_{out} continues to increase, and does not approach a limiting value at large A_{v}.

==== Compliance voltage ====
For Figure 3, a large op amp gain achieves the maximum R_{out} with only a small R_{E}. A low value for R_{E} means V_{2} also is small, allowing a low compliance voltage for this mirror, only a voltage V_{2} larger than the compliance voltage of the simple bipolar mirror. For this reason this type of mirror also is called a wide-swing current mirror, because it allows the output voltage to swing low compared to other types of mirror that achieve a large R_{out} only at the expense of large compliance voltages.

With the MOSFET circuit of Figure 4, like the circuit in Figure 3, the larger the op amp gain A_{v}, the smaller R_{E} can be made at a given R_{out}, and the lower the compliance voltage of the mirror.

=== Other current mirrors ===
There are many sophisticated current mirrors that have higher output resistances than the basic mirror (more closely approach an ideal mirror with current output independent of output voltage) and produce currents less sensitive to temperature and device parameter variations and to circuit voltage fluctuations. These multi-transistor mirror circuits are used both with bipolar and MOS transistors. These circuits include:

- the Widlar current source
- the Wilson current mirror used as a current source
- Cascoded current sources

== See also ==
- Current source
- Widlar current source
- Wilson current mirror
- Bipolar junction transistor
- MOSFET
- Channel length modulation
- Early effect
