= Constant-current diode =

Two-terminal electronic component that limits current to a specified maximum

Electric symbol

A constant-current diode is an electronic device that limits current to a maximal specified value for the device. It is known as a current-limiting diode (CLD) or current-regulating diode (CRD).

Internal structure

It consists of an n-channel JFET with the gate shorted to the source, which functions like a two-terminal current limiter (analogous to a voltage-limiting Zener diode). It allows a current through it to rise to a certain value, but not higher.

Note that some devices are unidirectional and voltage across the device must have only one polarity for it to operate as a CLD, whereas other devices are bidirectional and can operate properly with either polarity.

Wide-bandgap materials such as silicon carbide have been used in production devices to enable high-voltage applications in the kilovolt range.
