= Megavolt =

Megavolt may refer to:

- One million volts in physics and electronics
- Megavolt (Darkwing Duck), an antagonist in the animated television series Darkwing Duck
- Megavolt, an antagonist in the animated television series Teenage Mutant Ninja Turtles
