= Small-signal model =

Electronic circuit analysis method

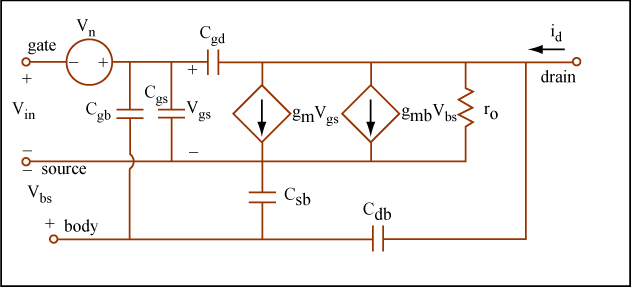
Circuit diagram of a small-signal model for a MOSFET.

Small-signal modeling is a common analysis technique in electronics engineering used to approximate the behavior of electronic circuits containing nonlinear devices, such as diodes, transistors, vacuum tubes, and integrated circuits, with linear equations. It is applicable to electronic circuits in which the AC signals (i.e., the time-varying currents and voltages in the circuit) are small relative to the DC bias currents and voltages. A small-signal model is an AC equivalent circuit in which the nonlinear circuit elements are replaced by linear elements whose values are given by the first-order (linear) approximation of their characteristic curve near the bias point.

== Overview ==
Many of the electrical components used in simple electric circuits, such as resistors, inductors, and capacitors are linear. Circuits made with these components, called linear circuits, are governed by linear differential equations, and can be solved easily with powerful mathematical frequency domain methods such as the Laplace transform.

In contrast, many of the components that make up electronic circuits, such as diodes, transistors, integrated circuits, and vacuum tubes are nonlinear; that is the current through them is not proportional to the voltage, and the output of two-port devices like transistors is not proportional to their input. The relationship between current and voltage in them is given by a curved line on a graph, their characteristic curve (I-V curve). In general these circuits don't have simple mathematical solutions. To calculate the current and voltage in them generally requires either graphical methods or simulation on computers using electronic circuit simulation programs like SPICE.

However in some electronic circuits such as radio receivers, telecommunications, sensors, instrumentation and signal processing circuits, the AC signals are "small" compared to the DC voltages and currents in the circuit. In these, perturbation theory can be used to derive an approximate AC equivalent circuit which is linear, allowing the AC behavior of the circuit to be calculated easily. In these circuits a steady DC current or voltage from the power supply, called a bias, is applied to each nonlinear component such as a transistor and vacuum tube to set its operating point, and the time-varying AC current or voltage which represents the signal to be processed is added to it. The point on the graph of the characteristic curve representing the bias current and voltage is called the quiescent point (Q point). In the above circuits the AC signal is small compared to the bias, representing a small perturbation of the DC voltage or current in the circuit about the Q point. If the characteristic curve of the device is sufficiently flat over the region occupied by the signal, using a Taylor series expansion the nonlinear function can be approximated near the bias point by its first order partial derivative (this is equivalent to approximating the characteristic curve by a straight line tangent to it at the bias point). These partial derivatives represent the incremental capacitance, resistance, inductance and gain seen by the signal, and can be used to create a linear equivalent circuit giving the response of the real circuit to a small AC signal. This is called the "small-signal model".

The small signal model is dependent on the DC bias currents and voltages in the circuit (the Q point). Changing the bias moves the operating point up or down on the curves, thus changing the equivalent small-signal AC resistance, gain, etc. seen by the signal.

Any nonlinear component whose characteristics are given by a continuous, single-valued, smooth (differentiable) curve can be approximated by a linear small-signal model. Small-signal models exist for electron tubes, diodes, field-effect transistors (FET) and bipolar transistors, notably the hybrid-pi model and various two-port networks. Manufacturers often list the small-signal characteristics of such components at "typical" bias values on their data sheets.

== Variable notation ==
- DC quantities (also known as bias), constant values with respect to time, are denoted by uppercase letters with uppercase subscripts. For example, the DC input bias voltage of a transistor would be denoted $V_\mathrm{IN}$. For example, one might say that $V_\mathrm{IN} = 5$.
- Small-signal quantities, which have zero average value, are denoted using lowercase letters with lowercase subscripts. Small signals typically used for modeling are sinusoidal, or "AC", signals. For example, the input signal of a transistor would be denoted as $v_\mathrm{in}$. For example, one might say that $v_\mathrm{in}(t) = 0.2\cos (2\pi t)$.
- Total quantities, combining both small-signal and large-signal quantities, are denoted using lower case letters and uppercase subscripts. For example, the total input voltage to the aforementioned transistor would be denoted as $v_\mathrm{IN}(t)$. The small-signal model of the total signal is then the sum of the DC component and the small-signal component of the total signal, or in algebraic notation, $v_\mathrm{IN}(t)=V_\mathrm{IN}+v_\mathrm{in}(t)$. For example, $v_\mathrm{IN}(t)=5 + 0.2\cos (2\pi t)$

== PN junction diodes ==
The (large-signal) Shockley equation for a diode can be linearized about the bias point or quiescent point (sometimes called Q-point) to find the small-signal conductance, capacitance and resistance of the diode. This procedure is described in more detail under diode modelling#Small-signal_modelling, which provides an example of the linearization procedure followed in small-signal models of semiconductor devices.

== Differences between small signal and large signal ==
A large signal is any signal having enough magnitude to reveal a circuit's nonlinear behavior. The signal may be a DC signal or an AC signal or indeed, any signal. How large a signal needs to be (in magnitude) before it is considered a large signal depends on the circuit and context in which the signal is being used. In some highly nonlinear circuits practically all signals need to be considered as large signals.

A small signal is part of a model of a large signal. To avoid confusion, note that there is such a thing as a small signal (a part of a model) and a small-signal model (a model of a large signal).

A small signal model consists of a small signal (having zero average value, for example a sinusoid, but any AC signal could be used) superimposed on a bias signal (or superimposed on a DC constant signal) such that the sum of the small signal plus the bias signal gives the total signal which is exactly equal to the original (large) signal to be modeled. This resolution of a signal into two components allows the technique of superposition to be used to simplify further analysis. (If superposition applies in the context.)

In analysis of the small signal's contribution to the circuit, the nonlinear components, which would be the DC components, are analyzed separately taking into account nonlinearity.

== See also ==
- Diode modelling
- Hybrid-pi model
- Early effect
- SPICE – Simulation program with integrated circuit emphasis, a general purpose analog electronic circuit simulator capable of solving small signal models.
