= Diode-connected transistor =

Transistor that acts as a diode

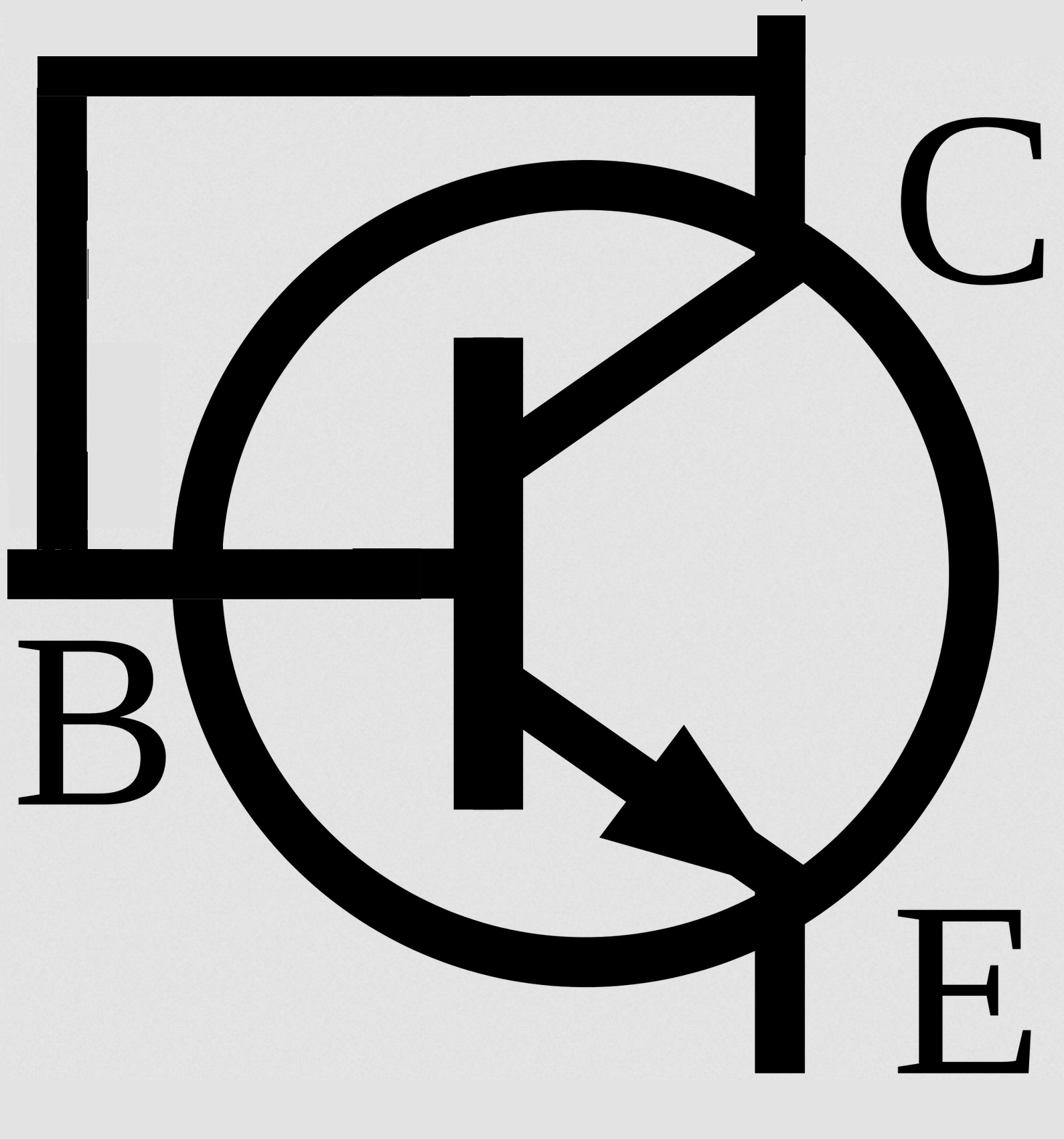
Connecting base and collector turns BJT into diode.

A diode-connected transistor is a method of creating a two-terminal rectifying device (a diode) out of a three-terminal transistor. A characteristic of diode-connected transistors is that they are always in the saturation region for metal–oxide–semiconductor field-effect transistors (MOSFETs) and junction-gate field-effect transistors (JFETs), and in the active region for bipolar junction transistors (BJTs).

A diode-connected transistor is made by connecting

- the base and collector of a BJT
- the drain and source of a JFET
- the gate and drain of a MOSFET

Diode-connected transistors are used in current mirrors to provide a voltage drop that tracks that of the other transistor as temperature changes. They also have very low reverse leakage currents.
