= Hybrid-pi model =

Model of electronic circuits involving transistors

Hybrid-pi is a popular circuit model used for analyzing the small signal behavior of bipolar junction and field effect transistors. Sometimes it is also called Giacoletto model because it was introduced by L.J. Giacoletto in 1969. The model can be quite accurate for low-frequency circuits and can easily be adapted for higher frequency circuits with the addition of appropriate inter-electrode capacitances and other parasitic elements.

== BJT parameters ==
The hybrid-pi model is a linearized two-port network approximation to the BJT using the small-signal base-emitter voltage, $\textstyle v_\text{be}$, and collector-emitter voltage, $\textstyle v_\text{ce}$, as independent variables, and the small-signal base current, $\textstyle i_\text{b}$, and collector current, $\textstyle i_\text{c}$, as dependent variables.

Figure 1: Simplified, low-frequency hybrid-pi BJT model.

A basic, low-frequency hybrid-pi model for the bipolar transistor is shown in figure 1. The various parameters are as follows.

$g_\text{m} = \left.\frac{i_\text{c}}{v_\text{be}}\right\vert_{v_\text{ce} = 0} = \frac{I_\text{C}}{V_\text{T}}$ is the transconductance, evaluated in a simple model, where:

- $\textstyle I_\text{C} \,$ is the quiescent collector current (also called the collector bias or DC collector current)
- $\textstyle V_\text{T} = \frac{kT}{e}$ is the thermal voltage, calculated from the Boltzmann constant, $\textstyle k$, the charge of an electron, $\textstyle e$, and the transistor temperature in kelvins, $\textstyle T$. At approximately room temperature (295 K, 22 °C or 71 °F), $\textstyle V_\text{T}$ is about 25 mV.

$r_\pi = \left.\frac{v_\text{be}}{i_\text{b}}\right\vert_{v_\text{ce} = 0} = \frac{V_\text{T}}{I_\text{B}} = \frac{\beta_0}{g_\text{m}}$ where:

- $\textstyle I_\text{B}$ is the DC (bias) base current.
- $\textstyle \beta_0 = \frac{I_\text{C}}{I_\text{B}}$ is the current gain at low frequencies (generally quoted as h_{fe} from the h-parameter model). This is a parameter specific to each transistor, and can be found on a datasheet.

$\textstyle r_\text{o} = \left.\frac{v_\text{ce}}{i_\text{c}}\right\vert_{v_\text{be} = 0} ~=~ \frac{1}{I_\text{C}}\left(V_\text{A} + V_\text{CE}\right) ~\approx~ \frac{V_\text{A}}{I_\text{C}}$ is the output resistance due to the Early effect ($\textstyle V_\text{A}$ is the Early voltage).

=== Related terms ===
The output conductance, g_{ce}, is the reciprocal of the output resistance, r_{o}:

$$g_\text{ce} = \frac{1}{r_\text{o}}$$.

The transresistance, r_{m}, is the reciprocal of the transconductance:

$$r_\text{m} = \frac{1}{g_\text{m}}$$.

=== Full model ===
Full hybrid-pi model

The full model introduces the virtual terminal, B′, so that the base spreading resistance, r_{bb}, (the bulk resistance between the base contact and the active region of the base under the emitter) and r_{b′e} (representing the base current required to make up for recombination of minority carriers in the base region) can be represented separately. C_{e} is the diffusion capacitance representing minority carrier storage in the base. The feedback components, r_{b′c} and C_{c}, are introduced to represent the Early effect and Miller effect, respectively.

== MOSFET parameters ==
Figure 2: Simplified, low-frequency hybrid-pi MOSFET model.

A basic, low-frequency hybrid-pi model for the MOSFET is shown in figure 2. The various parameters are as follows.

$$g_\text{m} = \left.\frac{i_\text{d}}{v_\text{gs}}\right\vert_{v_\text{ds} = 0}$$

is the transconductance, evaluated in the Shichman–Hodges model in terms of the Q-point drain current, $\scriptstyle I_\text{D}$:

$$g_\text{m} = \frac{2I_\text{D}}{V_{\text{GS}} - V_\text{th}}$$,

where:

- $\scriptstyle I_\text{D}$ is the quiescent drain current (also called the drain bias or DC drain current)
- $\scriptstyle V_\text{th}$ is the threshold voltage and
- $\scriptstyle V_\text{GS}$ is the gate-to-source voltage.

The combination:

$$V_\text{ov} = V_\text{GS} - V_\text{th}$$

is often called overdrive voltage.

$$r_\text{o} = \left.\frac{v_\text{ds}}{i_\text{d}}\right\vert_{v_\text{gs} = 0}$$

is the output resistance due to channel length modulation, calculated using the Shichman–Hodges model as

$$\begin{align}
r_\text{o} &= \frac{1}{I_\text{D}}\left(\frac{1}{\lambda} + V_\text{DS}\right) \\
&= \frac{1}{I_\text{D}}\left(V_E L + V_\text{DS}\right) \approx \frac{V_E L}{I_\text{D}}
\end{align}$$

using the approximation for the channel length modulation parameter, λ:

$$\lambda = \frac{1}{V_\text{E} L}$$.

Here V_{E} is a technology-related parameter (about 4 V/μm for the 65 nm technology node) and L is the length of the source-to-drain separation.

The drain conductance is the reciprocal of the output resistance:

$$g_\text{ds} = \frac{1}{r_\text{o}}$$.

== See also ==
- h-parameter model
- Small-signal model
