= Common base =

Type of voltage amplifier

Figure 1: Basic NPN common base circuit (neglecting biasing details)

In electronics, a common-base (also known as grounded-base) amplifier is one of three basic single-stage bipolar junction transistor (BJT) amplifier topologies, typically used as a current buffer or voltage amplifier.

In this circuit the emitter terminal of the transistor serves as the input, the collector as the output, and the base is connected to ground, or "common", hence its name. The analogous field-effect transistor circuit is the common-gate amplifier.

== Applications ==
This arrangement is not very common in low-frequency discrete circuits, where it is usually employed for amplifiers that require an unusually low input impedance, for example to act as a preamplifier for moving-coil microphones. However, it is popular in integrated circuits and in high-frequency amplifiers, for example for VHF and UHF, because its input capacitance does not suffer from the Miller effect, which degrades the bandwidth of the common-emitter configuration, and because of the relatively high isolation between the input and output. This high isolation means that there is little feedback from the output back to the input, leading to high stability.

This configuration is also useful as a current buffer, since it has a current gain of approximately unity (see formulae below). Often a common base is used in this manner, preceded by a common-emitter stage. The combination of these two form the cascode configuration, which possesses several of the benefits of each configuration, such as high input impedance and isolation.

== Low-frequency characteristics ==
At low frequencies and under small-signal conditions, the circuit in Figure 1 can be represented by that in Figure 2, where the hybrid-pi model for the BJT has been employed. The input signal is represented by a Thévenin voltage source v_{s} with a series resistance R_{s} and the load is a resistor R_{L}. This circuit can be used to derive the following characteristics of the common base amplifier.

	Definition	Expression	Approximate expression	Conditions
Open-circuit voltage gain	${A_{v}} = \left. \frac{v_\text{o}}{v_\text{i}} \right|_{R_\text{L} = \infty}$	$\frac{(g_m r_\text{o} + 1) R_\text{C}}{R_\text{C} + r_\text{o}}$	$g_\text{m} R_\text{C}$	$r_\text{o} \gg R_\text{C}$
Short-circuit current gain	$A_{i} = \left. {i_\text{o} \over i_\text{i}} \right|_{R_\text{L} = 0}$	$\frac{r_\pi + \beta r_\text{o}}{r_\pi + (\beta + 1)r_\text{o}}$	$1$	$\beta \gg 1$
Input resistance	$R_\text{in} = \frac{v_i}{i_i}$	$\frac{(r_\text{o} + R_\text{C} \parallel R_\text{L}) r_\text{E}}{r_\text{o} + r_\text{E} + \frac{R_\text{C} \parallel R_\text{L}}{\beta + 1}}$	$r_\text{E} \left( \approx \frac{1}{g_\text{m}} \right)$	$r_\text{o} \gg R_\text{C} \parallel R_\text{L}\quad \left(\beta \gg 1\right)$
Output resistance	$R_\text{out} = \left. \frac{v_\text{o}}{-i_\text{o}} \right|_{v_\text{s} = 0}$	$R_\text{C} \parallel \left([1 + g_\text{m} (r_\pi \parallel R_\text{S})]r_\text{o} + r_\pi \parallel R_\text{S}\right)$	$$\begin{align} R_\text{C} &\parallel r_\text{o} \\ R_\text{C} &\parallel \left(r_\text{o}\left[1 + g_\text{m}\left(r_\pi \parallel R_\text{S}\right)\right]\right) \end{align}$$	$$\begin{align} R_\text{S} &\ll r_\text{E} \\ R_\text{S} &\gg r_\text{E} \end{align}$$

Note: Parallel lines (||) indicate components in parallel.

In general, the overall voltage/current gain may be substantially less than the open/short-circuit gains listed above (depending on the source and load resistances) due to the loading effect.

=== Active loads ===
For voltage amplification, the range of allowed output voltage swing in this amplifier is tied to voltage gain when a resistor load R_{C} is employed, as in Figure 1. That is, large voltage gain requires large R_{C}, and that in turn implies a large DC voltage drop across R_{C}. For a given supply voltage, the larger this drop, the smaller the transistor V_{CB} and the less output swing is allowed before saturation of the transistor occurs, with resultant distortion of the output signal. To avoid this situation, an active load can be used, for example, a current mirror. If this choice is made, the value of R_{C} in the table above is replaced by the small-signal output resistance of the active load, which is generally at least as large as the r_{O} of the active transistor in Figure 1. On the other hand, the DC voltage drop across the active load has a fixed low value (the compliance voltage of the active load), much less than the DC voltage drop incurred for comparable gain using a resistor R_{C}. That is, an active load imposes less restriction on the output voltage swing. Notice that active load or not, large AC gain still is coupled to large AC output resistance, which leads to poor voltage division at the output except for large loads R_{L} ≫ R_{out}.

For use as a current buffer, gain is not affected by R_{C}, but output resistance is. Because of the current division at the output, it is desirable to have an output resistance for the buffer much larger than the load R_{L} being driven, so large signal currents can be delivered to a load. If a resistor R_{C} is used, as in Figure 1, a large output resistance is coupled to a large R_{C}, again limiting the signal swing at the output. (Even though current is delivered to the load, usually a large current signal into the load implies a large voltage swing across the load as well.) An active load provides high AC output resistance with much less serious impact upon the amplitude of output signal swing.

== Overview of characteristics ==
Several example applications are described in detail below. A brief overview follows.

- The amplifier input impedance R_{in} looking into the emitter node is very low, given approximately by
  $$R_\text{in} = r_\text{E} = \frac{V_\text{T}}{I_\text{E}},$$

where V_{T} is the thermal voltage, and I_{E} is the DC emitter current.
For example, for V_{T} = 26 mV and I_{E} = 10 mA, rather typical values, R_{in} = 2.6 Ω. If I_{E} is reduced to increase R_{in}, there are other consequences like lower transconductance, higher output resistance and lower β that also must be considered. A practical solution to this low-input-impedance problem is to place a common-emitter stage at the input to form a cascode amplifier.

- Because the input impedance is so low, most signal sources have larger source impedance than the common-base amplifier R_{in}. The consequence is that the source delivers a current to the input rather than a voltage, even if it is a voltage source. (According to Norton's theorem, this current is approximately i_{in} = v_{S} / R_{S}). If the output signal also is a current, the amplifier is a current buffer and delivers the same current as is input. If the output is taken as a voltage, the amplifier is a transresistance amplifier and delivers a voltage dependent on the load impedance, for example v_{out} = i_{in} R_{L} for a resistor load R_{L} much smaller in value than the amplifier output resistance R_{out}. That is, the voltage gain in this case (explained in more detail below) is
  $$v_\text{out} = i_\text{in} R_\text{L} = v_\text{s} \frac{R_\text{L}}{R_\text{S}} \Rightarrow A_v = \frac{v_\text{out}}{v_\text{S}} = \frac{R_\text{L}}{R_\text{S}}.$$

Note that for source impedances such that R_{S} ≫ r_{E} the output impedance approaches R_{out} = R_{C} || [g_{m} (r_{π} || R_{S}) r_{O}].

- For the special case of very low-impedance sources, the common-base amplifier does work as a voltage amplifier, one of the examples discussed below. In this case (explained in more detail below), when R_{S} ≪ r_{E} and R_{L} ≪ R_{out}, the voltage gain becomes
  $$A_\text{v} = \frac{v_\text{out}}{v_\text{S}} = \frac{R_\text{L}}{r_\text{E}} \approx g_\text{m} R_\text{L},$$

where g_{m} = I_{C} / V_{T} is the transconductance. Notice that for low source impedance, R_{out} = r_{O} || R_{C}.

- The inclusion of r_{O} in the hybrid-pi model predicts reverse transmission from the amplifiers output to its input, that is the amplifier is bilateral. One consequence of this is that the input/output impedance is affected by the load/source termination impedance, hence, for example, the output resistance R_{out} may vary over the range r_{O} || R_{C} ≤ R_{out} ≤ (β + 1) r_{O} || R_{C}, depending on the source resistance R_{S}. The amplifier can be approximated as unilateral when neglect of r_{O} is accurate (valid for low gains and low to moderate load resistances), simplifying the analysis. This approximation often is made in discrete designs, but may be less accurate in RF circuits, and in integrated-circuit designs, where active loads normally are used.

=== Voltage amplifier ===
Figure 2: Small-signal model for calculating various parameters; Thévenin voltage source as signal

For the case when the common-base circuit is used as a voltage amplifier, the circuit is shown in Figure 2.

The output resistance is large, at least R_{C} || r_{O}, the value which arises with low source impedance (R_{S} ≪ r_{E}). A large output resistance is undesirable in a voltage amplifier, as it leads to poor voltage division at the output. Nonetheless, the voltage gain is appreciable even for small loads: according to the table, with R_{S} = r_{E} the gain is A_{v} = g_{m} R_{L} / 2. For larger source impedances, the gain is determined by the resistor ratio R_{L} / R_{S}, and not by the transistor properties, which can be an advantage where insensitivity to temperature or transistor variations is important.

An alternative to the use of the hybrid-pi model for these calculations is a general technique based upon two-port networks. For example, in an application like this one where voltage is the output, a g-equivalent two-port could be selected for simplicity, as it uses a voltage amplifier in the output port.

For R_{S} values in the vicinity of r_{E} the amplifier is transitional between voltage amplifier and current buffer. For R_{S} ≫ r_{E} the driver representation as a Thévenin source should be replaced by representation with a Norton source. The common base circuit stops behaving like a voltage amplifier and behaves like a current follower, as discussed next.

=== Current follower ===
Figure 3: Common base circuit with Norton driver; R_{C} is omitted because an active load is assumed with infinite small-signal output resistance

Figure 3 shows the common base amplifier used as a current follower. The circuit signal is provided by an AC Norton source (current I_{S}, Norton resistance R_{S}) at the input, and the circuit has a resistor load R_{L} at the output.

As mentioned earlier, this amplifier is bilateral as a consequence of the output resistance r_{O}, which connects the output to the input. In this case the output resistance is large even in the worst case (it is at least r_{O} || R_{C} and can become (β + 1) r_{O} || R_{C} for large R_{S}). Large output resistance is a desirable attribute of a current source because favorable current division sends most of the current to the load. The current gain is very nearly unity as long as R_{S} ≫ r_{E}.

An alternative analysis technique is based upon two-port networks. For example, in an application like this one where current is the output, an h-equivalent two-port is selected because it uses a current amplifier in the output port.

== See also ==
- Common collector
- Common emitter
- Common gate
- Common drain
- Common source
- Differential amplifier
- Hybrid-pi model
- Two-port network
