= Common gate =

Electronic amplifier circuit type

Figure 1: Basic N-channel common-gate circuit (neglecting biasing details); current source I_{D} represents an active load; signal is applied at node V_{in} and output is taken from node V_{out}; output can be current or voltage

In electronics, a common-gate amplifier is one of three basic single-stage field-effect transistor (FET) amplifier topologies, typically used as a current buffer or voltage amplifier. In this circuit, the source terminal of the transistor serves as the input, the drain is the output, and the gate is connected to some DC biasing voltage (i.e. an AC ground), or "common," hence its name. The analogous bipolar junction transistor circuit is the common-base amplifier.

== Applications ==
This configuration is used less often than the common source or source follower. However, it can be combined with common source amplifiers to create cascode configurations. It is useful in, for example, CMOS RF receivers, especially when operating near the frequency limitations of the FETs; it is desirable because of the ease of impedance matching and potentially has lower noise. Gray and Meyer provide a general reference for this circuit.

== Low-frequency characteristics ==
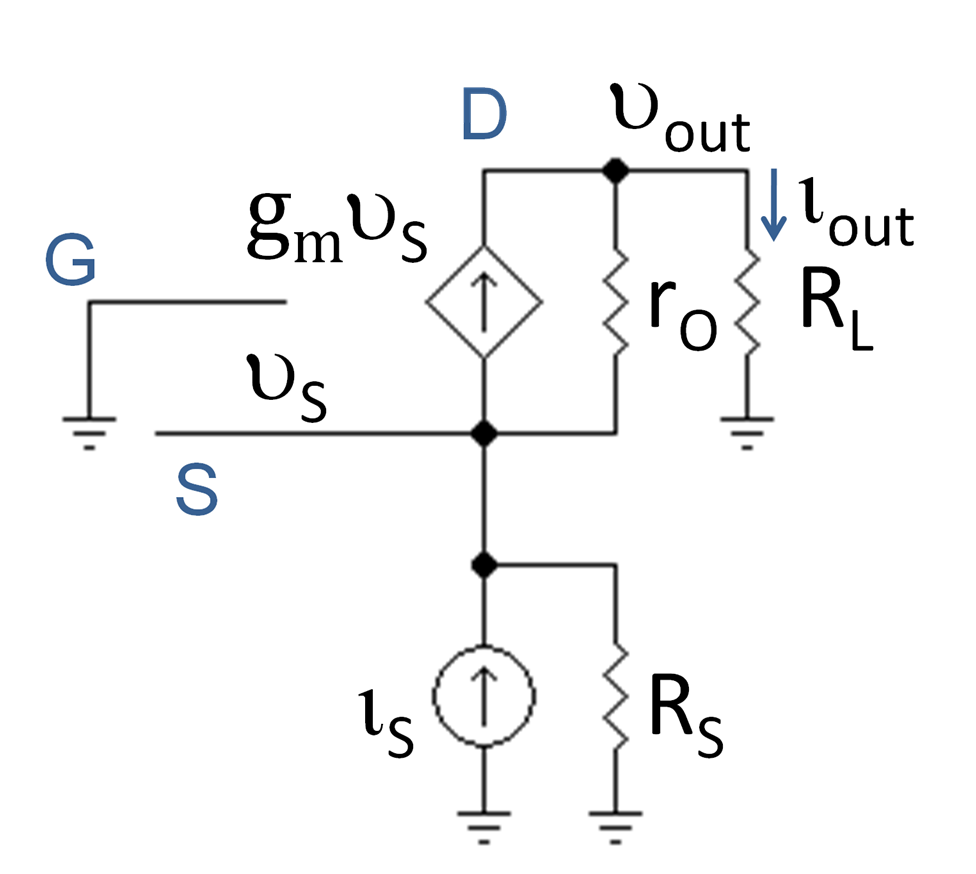
Figure 2: Small-signal low-frequency hybrid-pi model for amplifier driven by a Norton signal source

At low frequencies and under small-signal conditions, the circuit in Figure 1 can be represented by that in Figure 2, where the hybrid-pi model for the MOSFET has been employed.

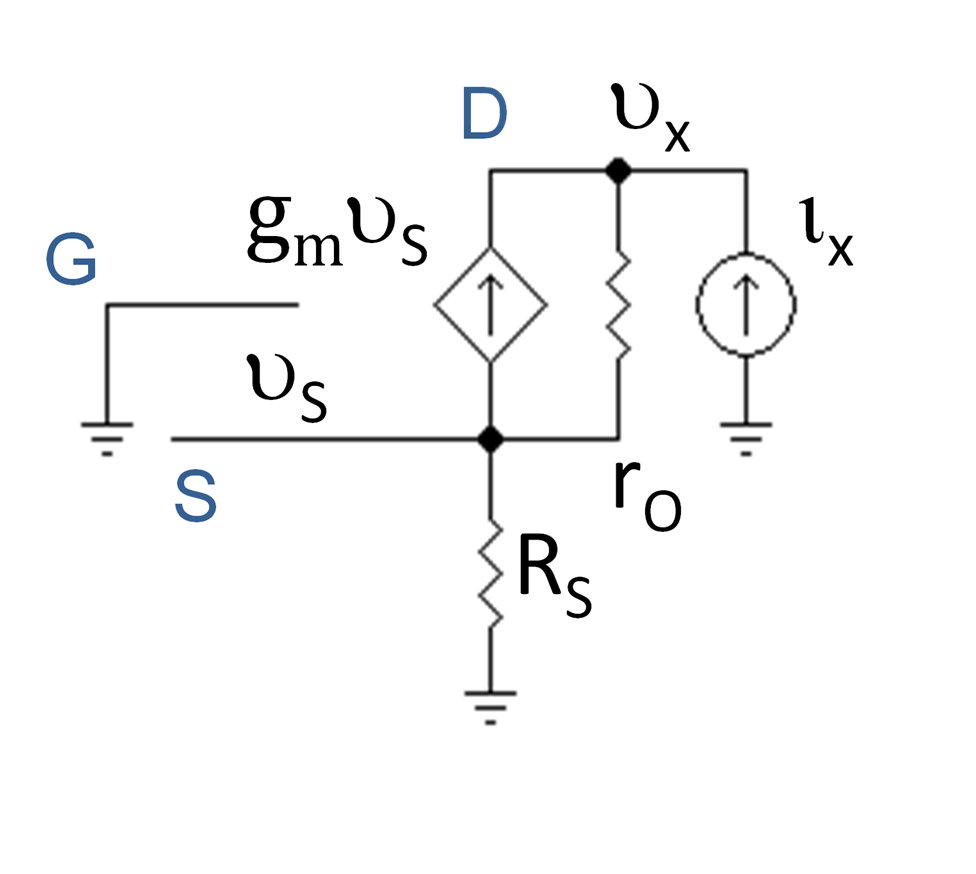
Figure 3: Hybrid pi model with test source i_{x} at output to find output resistance

The amplifier characteristics are summarized below in Table 1. The approximate expressions use the assumptions (usually accurate) r_{O} >> R_{L} and g_{m}r_{O} >> 1.

| Table 1 | Definition | Expression | Approximate expression |
|---|---|---|---|
| Short-circuit current gain | ${A_{i}} = {i_\mathrm{out} \over i_\mathrm{S}} \Big|_{R_{L}=0}$ | $\ 1$ | $\ 1$ |
| Open-circuit voltage gain | ${A_{v}} = {v_\mathrm{out} \over v_\mathrm{S}} \Big|_{R_{L}=\infty}$ | $$\begin{matrix} ((g_m+g_{mb}) r_\mathrm{O}+1) \frac {R_L} {r_O + R_L} \end{matrix}$$ | $\ g_m R_L$ |
| Input resistance | $R_\mathrm{in} = \frac{v_{S}}{i_{S}}$ | ${{R_L+r_O} \over {(g_m+g_{mb}) r_O +1}}$ | $$\begin{matrix} \frac {1} {g_m} \end{matrix}$$ |
| Output resistance | $R_\mathrm{out} =\frac{v_{x}}{i_{x}}$ | $\ (1+(g_m+g_{mb})r_O)R_S + r_O$ | $(g_m r_O)R_S$ |

In general, the overall voltage/current gain may be substantially less than the open/short circuit gains listed above (depending on the source and load resistances) due to the loading effect.

=== Closed circuit voltage gain ===
Taking input and output loading into consideration, the closed circuit voltage gain (that is, the gain with load R_{L} and source with resistance R_{S} both attached) of the common gate can be written as:

$${A_\mathrm{v}} \approx \begin{matrix} \frac {g_m R_\mathrm{L}} {1+g_mR_S} \end{matrix}$$,

which has the simple limiting forms

$$A_\mathrm{v} = \begin{matrix} \frac {R_L}{R_S}\end{matrix} \ \ \mathrm{ or } \ \ A_\mathrm{v} = g_m R_L$$,

depending upon whether g_{m}R_{S} is much larger or much smaller than one.

In the first case the circuit acts as a current follower, as understood as follows: for R_{S} >> 1/g_{m} the voltage source can be replaced by its Norton equivalent with Norton current v_{Thév} / R_{S} and parallel Norton resistance R_{S}. Because the amplifier input resistance is small, the driver delivers by current division a current v_{Thév} / R_{S} to the amplifier. The current gain is unity, so the same current is delivered to the output load R_{L}, producing by Ohm's law an output voltage v_{out} = v_{Thév}R_{L} / R_{S}, that is, the first form of the voltage gain above.

In the second case R_{S} << 1/g_{m} and the Thévenin representation of the source is useful, producing the second form for the gain, typical of voltage amplifiers.

Because the input impedance of the common-gate amplifier is very low, the cascode amplifier often is used instead. The cascode places a common-source amplifier between the voltage driver and the common-gate circuit to permit voltage amplification using a driver with R_{S} >> 1/g_{m}.

== See also ==
- Electronic amplifier variables
- Two-port networks
- Common drain
- Common source
- Common base
- Common emitter
- Common collector
