= Common source =

Electronic amplifier circuit type

Figure 1: Basic N-channel JFET common-source circuit (neglecting biasing details).

Figure 2: Basic N-channel JFET common-source circuit with source degeneration.

In electronics, a common-source amplifier is one of three basic single-stage field-effect transistor (FET) amplifier topologies, typically used as a voltage or transconductance amplifier. The easiest way to tell if a FET is common source, common drain, or common gate is to examine where the signal enters and leaves. The remaining terminal is what is known as "common". In this example, the signal enters the gate, and exits the drain. The only terminal remaining is the source. This is a common-source FET circuit. The analogous bipolar junction transistor circuit may be viewed as a transconductance amplifier or as a voltage amplifier. (See classification of amplifiers). As a transconductance amplifier, the input voltage is seen as modulating the current going to the load. As a voltage amplifier, input voltage modulates the current flowing through the FET, changing the voltage across the output resistance according to Ohm's law. However, the FET device's output resistance typically is not high enough for a reasonable transconductance amplifier (ideally infinite), nor low enough for a decent voltage amplifier (ideally zero). As seen below in the formula, the voltage gain depends on the load resistance, so it cannot be applied to drive low-resistance devices, such as a speaker (having a resistance of 8 ohms). Another major drawback is the amplifier's limited high-frequency response. Therefore, in practice the output often is routed through either a voltage follower (common-drain or CD stage), or a current follower (common-gate or CG stage), to obtain more favorable output and frequency characteristics. The CS–CG combination is called a cascode amplifier.

== Characteristics ==
At low frequencies and using a simplified hybrid-pi model (where the output resistance due to channel length modulation is not considered), the following closed-loop small-signal characteristics can be derived.

	Definition	Expression
Current gain	$A_\text{i} \triangleq \frac{i_\text{out}}{i_\text{in}}\,$	$\infty\,$
Voltage gain	$A_\text{v} \triangleq \frac{v_\text{out}}{v_\text{in}}\,$	$$\begin{matrix}-\frac {g_\mathrm{m} R_\text{D}}{1+g_\mathrm{m}R_\text{S}}\end{matrix}\,$$
Input impedance	$r_\text{in} \triangleq \frac{v_\text{in}}{i_\text{in}}\,$	$\infty\,$
Output impedance	$r_\text{out} \triangleq \frac{v_\text{out}}{i_\text{out}}$	$R_\text{D}\,$

=== Bandwidth ===
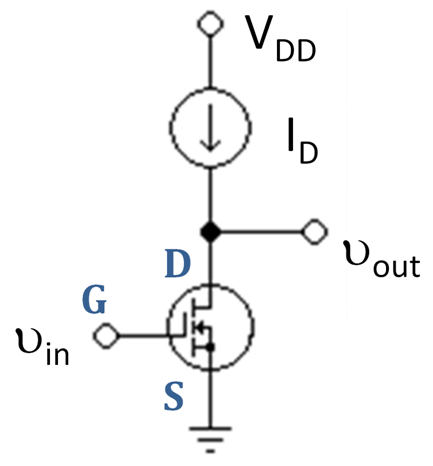
Figure 3: Basic N-channel MOSFET common-source amplifier with active load I_{D}.

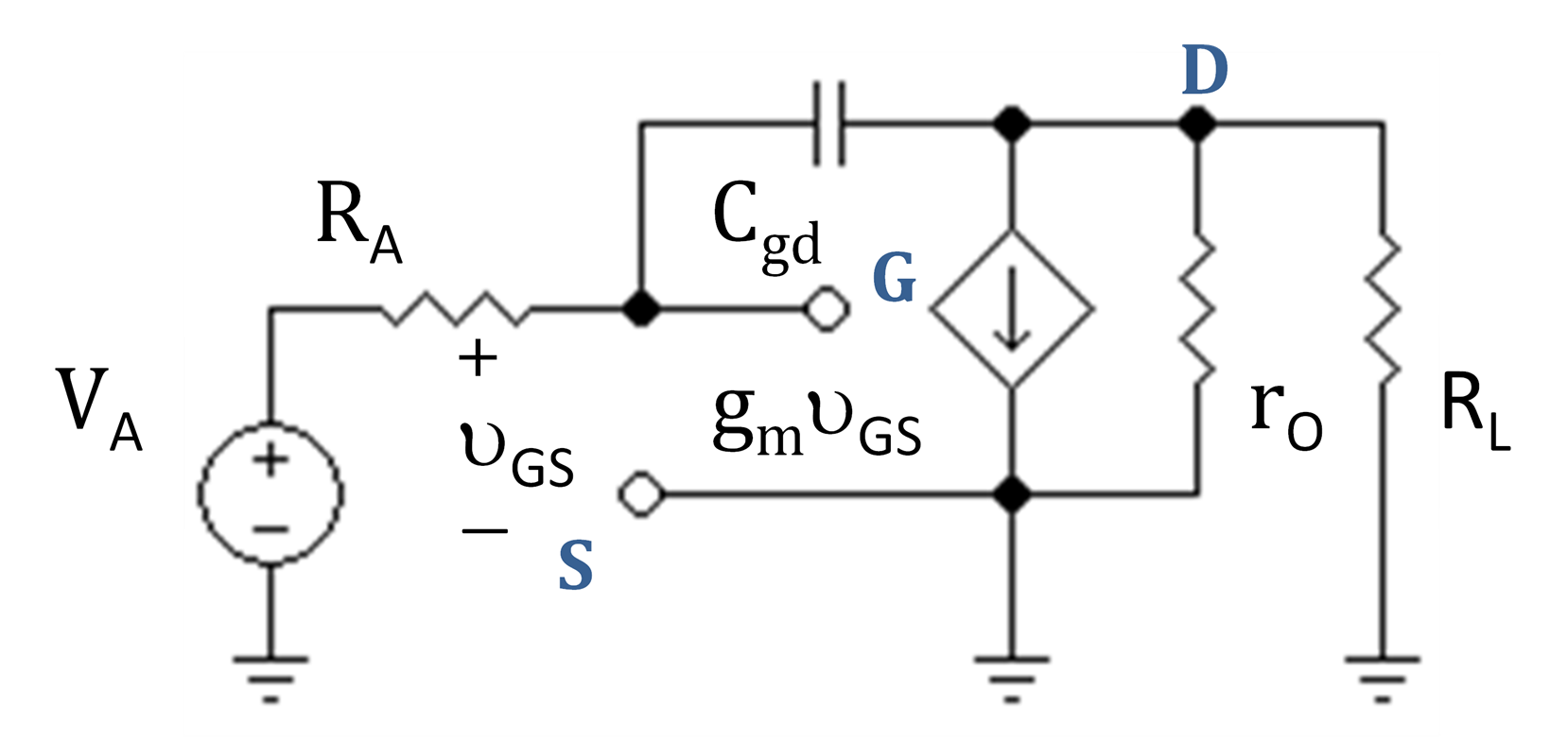
Figure 4: Small-signal circuit for N-channel MOSFET common-source amplifier.

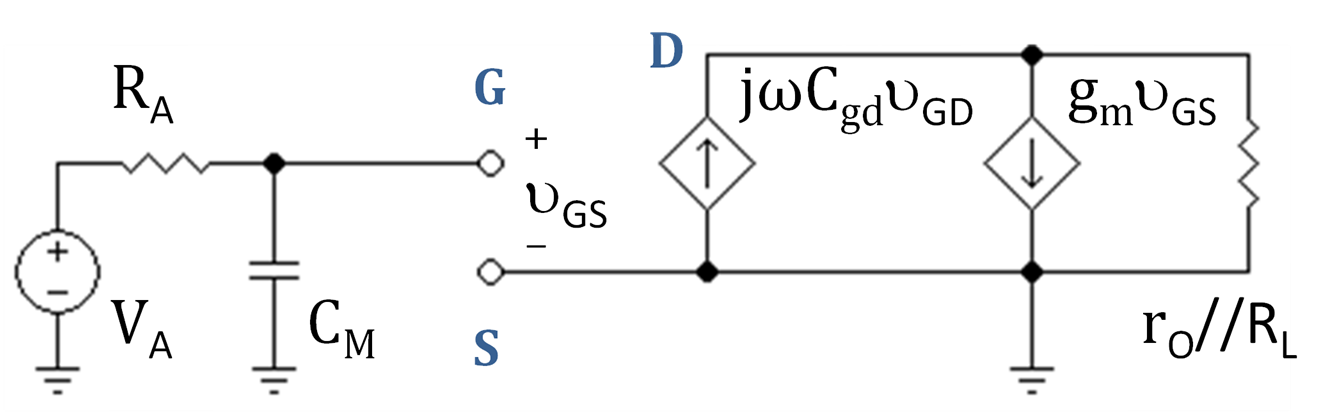
Figure 5: Small-signal circuit for N-channel MOSFET common-source amplifier using Miller's theorem to introduce Miller capacitance C_{M}.

Bandwidth of common-source amplifier tends to be low, due to high capacitance resulting from the Miller effect. The gate-drain capacitance is effectively multiplied by the factor $1+|A_\text{v}|\,$, thus increasing the total input capacitance and lowering the overall bandwidth.

Figure 3 shows a MOSFET common-source amplifier with an active load. Figure 4 shows the corresponding small-signal circuit when a load resistor R_{L} is added at the output node and a Thévenin driver of applied voltage V_{A} and series resistance R_{A} is added at the input node. The limitation on bandwidth in this circuit stems from the coupling of parasitic transistor capacitance C_{gd} between gate and drain and the series resistance of the source R_{A}. (There are other parasitic capacitances, but they are neglected here as they have only a secondary effect on bandwidth.)

Using Miller's theorem, the circuit of Figure 4 is transformed to that of Figure 5, which shows the Miller capacitance C_{M} on the input side of the circuit. The size of C_{M} is decided by equating the current in the input circuit of Figure 5 through the Miller capacitance, say i_{M}, which is:

$$\  i_\mathrm{M} = j \omega C_\mathrm{M} v_\mathrm{GS} = j \omega C_\mathrm{M} v_\mathrm{G}$$,

to the current drawn from the input by capacitor C_{gd} in Figure 4, namely jωC_{gd} v_{GD}. These two currents are the same, making the two circuits have the same input behavior, provided the Miller capacitance is given by:

$$C_\mathrm{M} = C_\mathrm{gd} \frac {v_\mathrm{GD}} {v_\mathrm{GS}} = C_\mathrm{gd} \left( 1 - \frac {v_\mathrm{D}} {v_\mathrm{G}} \right)$$.

Usually the frequency dependence of the gain v_{D} / v_{G} is unimportant for frequencies even somewhat above the corner frequency of the amplifier, which means a low-frequency hybrid-pi model is accurate for determining v_{D} / v_{G}. This evaluation is Miller's approximation and provides the estimate (just set the capacitances to zero in Figure 5):

$$\frac {v_\mathrm{D}} {v_\mathrm{G}} \approx -g_\mathrm{m} (r_\mathrm{O} \parallel R_\mathrm{L})$$,

so the Miller capacitance is

$$C_\mathrm{M} = C_\mathrm{gd} \left( 1+g_\mathrm{m} (r_\mathrm{O} \parallel R_\mathrm{L})\right)$$.

The gain g_{m} (r_{O} || R_{L}) is large for large R_{L}, so even a small parasitic capacitance C_{gd} can become a large influence in the frequency response of the amplifier, and many circuit tricks are used to counteract this effect. One trick is to add a common-gate (current-follower) stage to make a cascode circuit. The current-follower stage presents a load to the common-source stage that is very small, namely the input resistance of the current follower (R_{L} ≈ 1 / g_{m} ≈ V_{ov} / (2I_{D}); see common gate). Small R_{L} reduces C_{M}. The article on the common-emitter amplifier discusses other solutions to this problem.

Returning to Figure 5, the gate voltage is related to the input signal by voltage division as:

$$v_\mathrm{G} = V_\mathrm{A}\frac {1/(j \omega C_\mathrm{M}) } {1/(j \omega C_\mathrm{M}) +R_\mathrm{A}} = V_\mathrm{A}\frac {1} {1+j \omega C_\mathrm{M} R_\mathrm{A}}$$.

The bandwidth (also called the 3 dB frequency) is the frequency where the signal drops to 1/ √2 of its low-frequency value. (In decibels, dB(√2) = 3.01 dB). A reduction to 1/ √2 occurs when ωC_{M} R_{A} = 1, making the input signal at this value of ω (call this value ω_{3 dB}, say) v_{G} = V_{A} / (1+j). The magnitude of (1+j) = √2. As a result, the 3 dB frequency f_{3 dB} = ω_{3 dB} / (2π) is:

$$f_\mathrm{3dB}=\frac {1}{2\pi R_\mathrm{A} C_\mathrm{M}}= \frac {1}{2\pi R_\mathrm{A} [ C_\mathrm{gd}(1+g_\mathrm{m} (r_\mathrm{O} \parallel R_\mathrm{L})]}$$.

If the parasitic gate-to-source capacitance C_{gs} is included in the analysis, it simply is parallel with C_{M}, so

$$f_\mathrm{3dB}=\frac {1}{2\pi R_\mathrm{A} (C_\mathrm{M}+C_\mathrm{gs})} =\frac {1}{2\pi R_\mathrm{A} [C_\mathrm{gs} + C_\mathrm{gd}(1+g_\mathrm{m} (r_\mathrm{O} \parallel R_\mathrm{L}))]}$$.

Notice that f_{3 dB} becomes large if the source resistance R_{A} is small, so the Miller amplification of the capacitance has little effect upon the bandwidth for small R_{A}. This observation suggests another circuit trick to increase bandwidth: add a common-drain (voltage-follower) stage between the driver and the common-source stage so the Thévenin resistance of the combined driver plus voltage follower is less than the R_{A} of the original driver.

Examination of the output side of the circuit in Figure 2 enables the frequency dependence of the gain v_{D} / v_{G} to be found, providing a check that the low-frequency evaluation of the Miller capacitance is adequate for frequencies f even larger than f_{3 dB}. (See article on pole splitting to see how the output side of the circuit is handled.)

== See also ==
- Miller effect
- Pole splitting
- Common gate
- Common drain
- Common base
- Common emitter
- Common collector
