= Schroeder Amplification =

Music equipment manufacturer in Highland Park, Illinois, US

Schroeder Amplification, Inc. is a manufacturer of handwired guitar tube amplifiers and effects. They are located in Highland Park, Illinois, and owned by Tim Schroeder.

== Critical reception ==
Premier Guitar awarded Schroeder Amplifiers' DB7, DB9, SA9 a 5-star review and praised the amplifier, calling it "an instant classic" and that the amp makes "the plainest of sonorities a thing of wonder".

Guitarist Nels Cline uses the Schroeder DB7, DB9, SA9. Andrew Bird also uses two red custom-built Schroeder amplifiers.

== Products ==
- Schroeder DB7, DB9, SA9 - all tube guitar amplifier
- Schroeder Dozer
- Schroeder Formula 50 Head
- Schroeder Sidecar - 2x12 speaker cabinet
- Schroeder Small Block Speaker Cabinet
- Schroeder "IT" - FET-based clean boost/buffer
- Schroeder Blister Agent - distortion pedal
