= Common drain =

Electronic amplifier circuit type

In electronics, a common-drain amplifier, also known as a source follower, is one of three basic single-stage field-effect transistor (FET) amplifier topologies, typically used as a voltage buffer. In this circuit (NMOS) the gate terminal of the transistor serves as the signal input, the source is the output, and the drain is common to both (input and output), hence its name. Because of its low dependence on the load resistor on the voltage gain, it can be used to drive low resistance loads, such as a speaker. The analogous bipolar junction transistor circuit is the common-collector amplifier. This circuit is also commonly called a "stabilizer".

In addition, this circuit is used to transform impedances. For example, the Thévenin resistance of a combination of a voltage follower driven by a voltage source with high Thévenin resistance is reduced to only the output resistance of the voltage follower (a small resistance). That resistance reduction makes the combination a more ideal voltage source. Conversely, a voltage follower inserted between a driving stage and a high load (i.e. a low resistance) presents an infinite resistance (low load) to the driving stage—an advantage in coupling a voltage signal to a large load.

== Characteristics ==
Basic N-channel JFET source follower circuit (neglecting biasing details)

At low frequencies, the source follower pictured at right has the following small-signal characteristics.

	Definition	Expression	Approximate expression	Conditions
Current gain	$A_\text{i} = \frac{i_\text{out}}{i_\text{in}}$	$\infty$	$\infty$	
Voltage gain	$A_\text{v} = \frac{v_\text{out}}{v_\text{in}}$	$\frac{g_m R_\text{S}}{g_m R_\text{S} + 1}$	$\approx 1$	$g_m R_\text{S} \gg 1$
Input impedance	$r_\text{in} = \frac{v_\text{in}}{i_\text{in}}$	$\infty$	$\infty$	
Output impedance	$r_\text{out} = \frac{v_\text{out}}{i_\text{out}}$	$R_{\text{S}} \parallel \frac{1}{g_m} = \frac{R_\text{S}}{g_m R_\text{S} + 1}$	$\approx \frac{1}{g_m}$	$g_m R_S \gg 1$

The variable g_{m} that is not listed in the schematic is the transconductance of the device (usually given in units of siemens).

== See also ==
- Negative feedback amplifier
- Buffer amplifier
- Two-port networks
- Hybrid-pi model
- Common collector
- Common emitter
- Common base
- Common source
- Common gate
- Emitter degeneration
