= Buffer amplifier =

Unity gain amplifier with low output impedance

Figure 1: Ideal voltage buffer (top) and current buffer (bottom)

In electronics, a buffer amplifier is a unity gain amplifier that copies a signal from one circuit to another while transforming its electrical impedance to provide a more ideal source (with a lower output impedance for a voltage buffer or a higher output impedance for a current buffer). This "buffers" the signal source in the first circuit against being affected by currents from the electrical load of the second circuit and may simply be called a buffer or follower when context is clear.

== Voltage buffer ==
A voltage buffer amplifier is used to transform a voltage signal with high output impedance from a first circuit into an identical voltage with low impedance for a second circuit. The interposed buffer amplifier prevents the second circuit from loading the first circuit unacceptably and interfering with its desired operation, since without the voltage buffer, the voltage of the second circuit is influenced by output impedance of the first circuit (as it is larger than the input impedance of the second circuit). In the ideal voltage buffer (Figure 1 top), the input impedance is infinite and the output impedance is zero. Other properties of the ideal buffer are: perfect linearity, regardless of signal amplitudes; and instant output response, regardless of the speed of the input signal.

If the voltage is transferred unchanged (the voltage gain A_{v} is 1), the amplifier is a unity gain buffer; also known as a voltage follower because the output voltage follows or tracks the input voltage. Although the voltage gain of a voltage buffer amplifier may be (approximately) unity, it usually provides considerable current gain and thus power gain. However, it is commonplace to say that it has a gain of 1 (or the equivalent 0 dB), referring to the voltage gain.

As an example, consider a Thévenin source (voltage V_{A}, series resistance R_{A}) driving a resistor load R_{L}. Because of voltage division (also referred to as "loading") the voltage across the load is only:

(V_{A} R_{L})/(R_{L} + R_{A}).

However, if the Thévenin source drives a unity gain buffer such as that in Figure 1 (top, with unity gain), the voltage input to the amplifier is V_{A}, and with no voltage division because the amplifier input resistance is infinite. At the output the dependent voltage source delivers voltage A_{v} V_{A} = V_{A} to the load, again without voltage division because the output resistance of the buffer is zero. A Thévenin equivalent circuit of the combined original Thévenin source and the buffer is an ideal voltage source V_{A} with zero Thévenin resistance.

== Current buffer ==
Typically a current buffer amplifier is used to transform a current signal with a low output impedance from a first circuit into an identical current with high impedance for a second circuit. The interposed buffer amplifier prevents the second circuit from loading the first circuit's current unacceptably and interfering with its desired operation. In the ideal current buffer (Figure 1 bottom), the output impedance is infinite (an ideal current source) and the input impedance is zero (a short circuit). Again, other properties of the ideal buffer are: perfect linearity, regardless of signal amplitudes; and instant output response, regardless of the speed of the input signal.

For a current buffer, if the current is transferred unchanged (the current gain β_{i} is 1), the amplifier is again a unity gain buffer; this time known as a current follower because the output current follows or tracks the input current.

As an example, consider a Norton source (current I_{A}, parallel resistance R_{A}) driving a resistor load R_{L}. Because of current division (also referred to as "loading") the current delivered to the load is only:

(I_{A} R_{A})/(R_{L} + R_{A}).

However, if the Norton source drives a unity gain buffer such as that in Figure 1 (bottom, with unity gain), the current input to the amplifier is I_{A}, with no current division because the amplifier input resistance is zero. At the output the dependent current source delivers current β_{i} I_{A} = I_{A} to the load, again without current division because the output resistance of the buffer is infinite. A Norton equivalent circuit of the combined original Norton source and the buffer is an ideal current source I_{A} with infinite Norton resistance.

== Voltage buffer examples ==
=== Op-amp implementation ===
Figure 2: A negative feedback amplifier

Figure 3. An op-amp–based unity gain buffer amplifier

A voltage follower boosted by a transistor; also can be seen as the "ideal transistor" without a base-emitter forward bias voltage drop on the input signal. This is the basic circuit of linear voltage regulators

A unity gain buffer amplifier may be constructed by applying a full series negative feedback (Fig. 2) to an op-amp simply by connecting its output to its inverting input, and connecting the signal source to the non-inverting input (Fig. 3). Unity gain here implies a voltage gain of one (i.e. 0 dB), but significant current gain is expected. In this configuration, the entire output voltage (β = 1 in Fig. 2) is fed back into the inverting input. The difference between the non-inverting input voltage and the inverting input voltage is amplified by the op-amp. This connection forces the op-amp to adjust its output voltage to simply equal the input voltage (V_{out} follows V_{in} so the circuit is named op-amp voltage follower).

The impedance of this circuit does not come from any change in voltage, but from the input and output impedances of the op-amp. The input impedance of the op-amp is very high (1 MΩ to 10 TΩ), meaning that the input of the op-amp does not load down the source and draws only minimal current from it. Because the output impedance of the op-amp is very low, it drives the load as if it were a perfect voltage source. Both the connections to and from the buffer are therefore bridging connections, which reduce power consumption in the source, distortion from overloading, crosstalk and other electromagnetic interference.

=== Simple transistor circuits ===
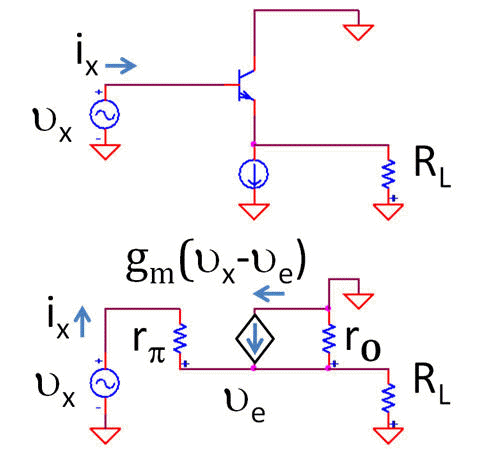
Figure 4: Top: BJT voltage follower Bottom: Small-signal, low-frequency equivalent circuit using hybrid-pi model

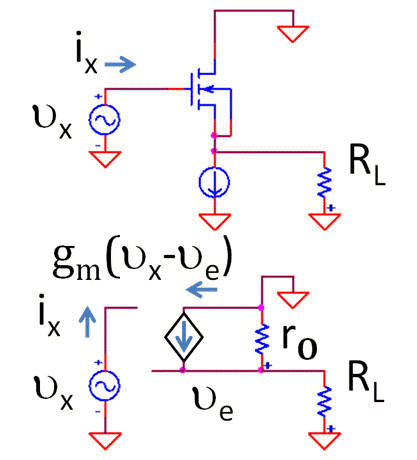
Figure 5: Top: MOSFET voltage follower Bottom: Small-signal, low-frequency equivalent circuit using hybrid-pi model

Other unity gain buffer amplifiers include the bipolar junction transistor in common-collector configuration (called an emitter follower because the emitter voltage follows the base voltage, or a voltage follower because the output voltage follows the input voltage); the field effect transistor in common-drain configuration (called a source follower because the source voltage follows the gate voltage or, again, a voltage follower because the output voltage follows the input voltage); or similar configurations using vacuum tubes (cathode follower), or other active devices. All such amplifiers actually have a gain of slightly less than unity (though the loss may be small and unimportant) and add a DC offset. Only one transistor is shown as the active device in these schematics (however, the current source in these circuits may require transistors too).

==== Impedance transformation using the bipolar voltage follower ====
Using the small-signal circuit in Figure 4, the impedance seen looking into the circuit is

$$R_{\rm in} = \frac {v_x} {i_x} = r_{\pi} + (\beta + 1) ({r_{\rm O}} || {R_{\rm L}})$$

(The analysis uses the relation g_{m}r_{π} = (I_{C} /V_{T}) (V_{T} /I_{B}) = β, which follows from the evaluation of these parameters in terms of the bias currents.) Assuming the usual case where r_{O} >> R_{L}, the impedance looking into the buffer is larger than the load R_{L} without the buffer by a factor of (β + 1), which is substantial because β is large. The impedance is increased even more by the added r_{π}, but often r_{π} << (β + 1) R_{L}, so the addition does not make much difference.

==== Impedance transformation using the MOSFET voltage follower ====
Using the small-signal circuit in Figure 5, the impedance seen looking into the circuit is no longer R_{L} but instead is infinite (at low frequencies) because the MOSFET draws no current.

As frequency is increased, the parasitic capacitances of the transistors come into play and the transformed input impedance drops with frequency.

==== Chart of single-transistor amplifiers ====
Some configurations of single-transistor amplifier can be used as a buffer to isolate the driver from the load. For most digital applications, an NMOS voltage follower (common drain) is the preferred configuration. These amplifiers have high input impedance, which means that the digital system will not need to supply a large current.

Amplifier type	JFET (n-channel)	BJT (npn)	Notes
Common gate/base			Typically used for current buffering
Common drain/collector			Voltage gain is close to unity, used for voltage buffering.

==== Logic buffer amplifiers ====
A non-linear buffer amplifier is sometimes used in digital circuits where a high current is required, perhaps for driving more gates than the normal fan-out of the logic family used, or for driving displays, or long wires, or other difficult loads. It is common for a single package to contain several discrete buffer amplifiers. For example, a hex buffer is a single package containing 6 buffer amplifiers, and an octal buffer is a single package containing 8 buffer amplifiers. The terms inverting buffer and non-inverting buffer effectively correspond with high-current capability single-input NOR or OR gates respectively.

==== Speaker array amplifiers ====
The majority of amplifiers used to drive large speaker arrays, such as those used for rock concerts, are amplifiers with 26-36dB voltage gain capable of high amounts of current into low impedance speaker arrays where the speakers are wired in parallel.

==== Driven guards ====
A driven guard utilizes a voltage buffer to protect a very high impedance signal line by surrounding the line with a shield driven by a buffer to the same voltage as the line, the close voltage matching of the buffer prevents the shield from leaking significant current into the high impedance line while the low impedance of the shield can absorb any stray currents that could affect the signal line.

== Current buffer examples ==
Simple unity gain buffer amplifiers include the bipolar junction transistor in common-base configuration, or the MOSFET in common-gate configuration (called a current follower because the output current follows the input current). The current gain of a current buffer amplifier is (approximately) unity.

=== Simple transistor circuits ===
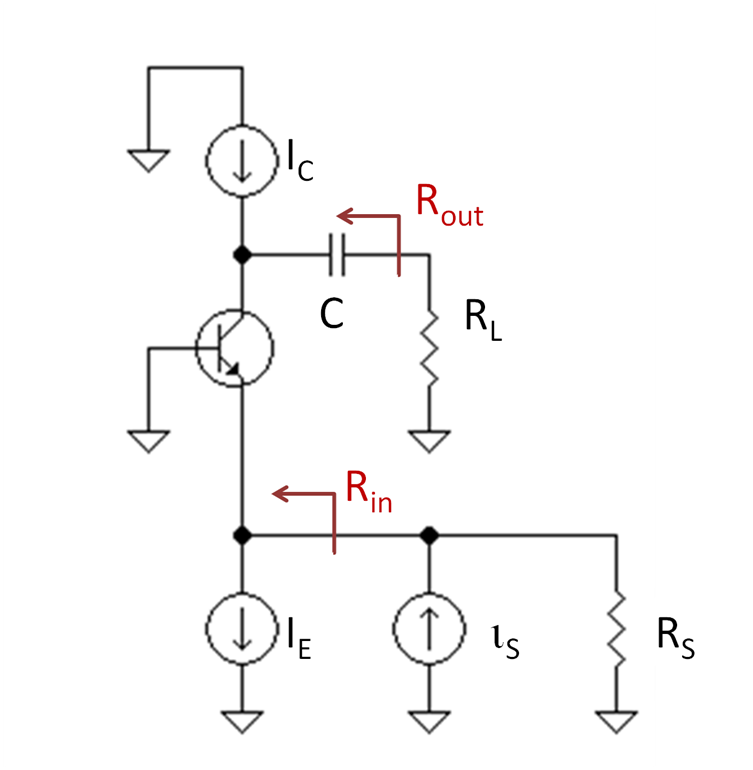
Figure 6: Bipolar current follower biased by current source I_{E} and with active load I_{C}

Figure 6 shows a bipolar current buffer biased with a current source (designated I_{E} for DC emitter current) and driving another DC current source as active load (designated I_{C} for DC collector current). The AC input signal current i_{in} is applied to the emitter node of the transistor by an AC Norton current source with Norton resistance R_{S}. The AC output current i_{out} is delivered by the buffer via a large coupling capacitor to load R_{L}. This coupling capacitor is large enough to be a short circuit at frequencies of interest.

Because the transistor output resistance connects input and output sides of the circuit, there is a (very small) backward voltage feedback from the output to the input so this circuit is not unilateral. In addition, for the same reason, the input resistance depends (slightly) upon the output load resistance, and the output resistance depends significantly on the input driver resistance. For more detail see the article on common base amplifier.

== See also ==
- Preamplifier
- Common base
- Common gate
- Common collector
- Common drain
- Current differencing buffered amplifier
- Negative feedback amplifier
- Driven shield
- Voltage controlled voltage source filter
