= Active load =

Active load or dynamic load is a component or a circuit that functions as a current-stable nonlinear resistor.

== Circuit design ==
In circuit design, an active load is a circuit component made up of active devices, such as transistors, intended to present a high small-signal impedance yet not requiring a large DC voltage drop, as would occur if a large resistor were used instead. Such large AC load impedances may be desirable, for example, to increase the AC gain of some types of amplifier. Most commonly the active load is the output part of a current mirror and is represented in an idealized manner as a current source. Usually, it is only a constant-current resistor that is a part of the whole current source including a constant voltage source as well (the power supply V_{CC} on the figures below).

=== Common base example ===
Figure 1: Basic NPN common base circuit with resistor load (neglecting biasing details). Signal is applied at V_{in}, output taken from node V_{out} may be a voltage or a current.

Figure 2: Basic NPN common base circuit (neglecting biasing details). Current source I_{C} represents an active load.

In Figure 1 the load is a resistor, and the current through the resistor is determined by Ohm's law as:

$$I_C = \frac {V_{CC} - V_\text{out}} {R_C}$$.

As a consequence of this relation, the voltage drop across the resistor is tied to the current at the Q-point. If the bias current is fixed for some performance reason, any increase in load resistance automatically leads to a lower voltage for V_{out}. which in turn lowers the voltage drop V_{CB} between collector and base, limiting the signal swing at the amplifier output (if the output swing is larger than V_{CB}, the transistor is driven out of active mode during part of the signal cycle).

In contrast, using the active load of Figure 2, the AC impedance of the ideal current source is infinite regardless of the voltage drop V_{CC} − V_{out}, which allows even a large value of V_{CB}. and consequently a large output signal swing.

=== Differential amplifiers ===
Active loads are frequently used in op-amp differential input stages, in order to enormously increase the gain.

=== Practical limitations ===
In practice the ideal current source is replaced by a current mirror, which is less ideal in two ways. First, its AC resistance is large, but not infinite. Second, the mirror requires a small voltage drop to maintain operation (to keep the output transistors of the mirror in active mode). As a result, the current mirror does limit the allowable output voltage swing, but this limitation is much less than for a resistor, and also does not depend upon the choice of bias current, leaving more flexibility than a resistor in designing the circuit.

== Test equipment ==
In the area of electronic test equipment, an active load is used for automatic testing of power supplies and other sources of electrical power to ensure that their output voltage and current are within their specifications over a range of load conditions, from no load to maximum load.

One approach to test loads uses a set of resistors of different values, and manual intervention. In contrast, an active load presents to the source a resistance value varied by electronic control, either by an analogue adjusting device such as a multi-turn potentiometer or, in automated test setups, by a digital computer. The load resistance can often be varied rapidly in order to test the power supply's transient response.

Just like a resistor, an active load converts the power supply's electrical energy to heat. The heat-dissipating devices (usually transistors) in an active load therefore have to be designed to withstand the resulting temperature rise, and are usually cooled by means of heatsinks.

For added convenience, active loads often include circuitry to measure the current and voltage delivered to the inputs, and may display these measurements on numeric readouts.
