= Input impedance =

Measure of the opposition to current flow by an external electrical load

In electrical engineering, the input impedance of an electrical network is the measure of the opposition to current (impedance), both static (resistance) and dynamic (reactance), into a load network or circuit that is external to the electrical source network. The input admittance (the reciprocal of impedance) is a measure of the load network's propensity to draw current. The source network is the portion of the network that transmits power, and the load network is the portion of the network that consumes power.

For an electrical property measurement instrument like an oscilloscope, the instrument is a load circuit to an electrical circuit (source circuit) to be measured, so the input impedance is the impedance of the instrument seen by the circuit to be measured.

The circuit to the left of the central set of open circles models the source circuit, while the circuit to the right models the connected circuit. Z_{S} is the output impedance seen by the load, and Z_{L} is the input impedance seen by the source.

== Input impedance ==
If the load network were replaced by a device with an output impedance equal to the input impedance of the load network (equivalent circuit), the characteristics of the source-load network would be the same from the perspective of the connection point. So, the voltage across and the current through the input terminals would be identical to the chosen load network.

Therefore, the input impedance of the load and the output impedance of the source determine how the source current and voltage change.

The Thévenin's equivalent circuit of the electrical network uses the concept of input impedance to determine the impedance of the equivalent circuit.

== Calculation ==
If one were to create a circuit with equivalent properties across the input terminals by placing the input impedance across the load of the circuit and the output impedance in series with the signal source, Ohm's law could be used to calculate the transfer function.

=== Electrical efficiency ===
The values of the input and output impedance are often used to evaluate the electrical efficiency of networks by breaking them up into multiple stages and evaluating the efficiency of the interaction between each stage independently. To minimize electrical losses, the output impedance of the signal should be insignificant in comparison to the input impedance of the network being connected, as the gain is equivalent to the ratio of the input impedance to the total impedance (input impedance + output impedance). In this case,

$Z_{in} \gg Z_{out}$ (or $Z_{L} \gg Z_{S}$)
The input impedance of the driven stage (load) is much larger than the output impedance of the drive stage (source).

==== Power factor ====
In AC circuits carrying power, the losses of energy in conductors due to the reactive component of the impedance can be significant. These losses manifest themselves in a phenomenon called phase imbalance, where the current is out of phase (lagging behind or ahead) with the voltage. Therefore, the product of the current and the voltage is less than what it would be if the current and voltage were in phase. With DC sources, reactive circuits have no impact, therefore power factor correction is not necessary.

For a circuit to be modelled with an ideal source, output impedance, and input impedance; the circuit's input reactance can be sized to be the negative of the output reactance at the source. In this scenario, the reactive component of the input impedance cancels the reactive component of the output impedance at the source. The resulting equivalent circuit is purely resistive in nature, and there are no losses due to phase imbalance in the source or the load.

$$\begin{align}
Z_{in} & = X - j\operatorname{Im}(Z_{out}) \\
\end{align}$$

=== Power transfer ===
The condition of maximum power transfer states that for a given source maximum power will be transferred when the resistance of the source is equal to the resistance of the load and the power factor is corrected by canceling out the reactance. When this occurs the circuit is said to be complex conjugate matched to the signals impedance. Note this only maximizes the power transfer, not the efficiency of the circuit. When the power transfer is optimized the circuit only runs at 50% efficiency.

The formula for complex conjugate matched is

$$\begin{align}
Z_{in} & = Z_{out}^* \\
& = \left\vert Z_{out} \right\vert e^{- j \Theta_{out}} \\
& = \operatorname{Re}(Z_{out}) - j \operatorname{Im}(Z_{out}). \\
\end{align}$$

When there is no reactive component this equation simplifies to $Z_{in} = Z_{out}$ as the imaginary part of $Z_{out}$ is zero.

=== Impedance matching ===
When the characteristic impedance of a transmission line, $Z_{line}$, does not match the impedance of the load network, $Z_{in}$, the load network will reflect back some of the source signal. This can create standing waves on the transmission line. To minimize reflections, the characteristic impedance of the transmission line and the impedance of the load circuit have to be equal (or "matched"). If the impedance matches, the connection is known as a matched connection, and the process of correcting an impedance mismatch is called impedance matching. Since the characteristic impedance for a homogeneous transmission line is based on geometry alone and is therefore constant, and the load impedance can be measured independently, the matching condition holds regardless of the placement of the load (before or after the transmission line).

$$Z_{in} = Z_{line}$$

== Applications ==
=== Signal processing ===
In modern signal processing, devices, such as operational amplifiers, are designed to have an input impedance several orders of magnitude higher than the output impedance of the source device connected to that input. This is called impedance bridging. The losses due to input impedance (loss) in these circuits will be minimized, and the voltage at the input of the amplifier will be close to voltage as if the amplifier circuit was not connected. When a device whose input impedance could cause significant degradation of the signal is used, often a device with a high input impedance and a low output impedance is used to minimize its effects. Voltage follower or impedance-matching transformers are often used for these effects.

The input impedance for high-impedance amplifiers (such as vacuum tubes, field effect transistor amplifiers and op-amps) is often specified as a resistance in parallel with a capacitance (e.g., 2.2 MΩ ∥ 1 pF). Pre-amplifiers designed for high input impedance may have a slightly higher effective noise voltage at the input (while providing a low effective noise current), and so slightly more noisy than an amplifier designed for a specific low-impedance source, but in general a relatively low-impedance source configuration will be more resistant to noise (particularly mains hum).

=== Radio frequency power systems ===
Signal reflections caused by an impedance mismatch at the end of a transmission line can result in distortion and potential damage to the driving circuitry.

In analog video circuits, impedance mismatch can cause "ghosting", where the time-delayed echo of the principal image appears as a weak and displaced image (typically to the right of the principal image). In high-speed digital systems, such as HD video, reflections result in interference and potentially corrupt signal.

The standing waves created by the mismatch are periodic regions of higher than normal voltage. If this voltage exceeds the dielectric breakdown strength of the insulating material of the line then an arc will occur. This in turn can cause a reactive pulse of high voltage that can destroy the transmitter's final output stage.

In RF systems, typical values for line and termination impedance are 50 Ω and 75 Ω.

To maximise power transmission for radio frequency power systems the circuits should be complex conjugate matched throughout the power chain, from the transmitter output, through the transmission line (a balanced pair, a coaxial cable, or a waveguide), to the antenna system, which consists of an impedance matching device and the radiating element(s).

== See also ==
- Output impedance
- Damping factor
- Voltage divider
- Dummy load
