= Output impedance =

Measure of the opposition to current flow by an internal electrical load

In electrical engineering, the output impedance of an electrical network is the measure of the opposition to current flow (impedance), both static (resistance) and dynamic (reactance), into the load network being connected that is internal to the electrical source. The output impedance is a measure of the source's propensity to drop in voltage when the load draws current, the source network being the portion of the network that transmits and the load network being the portion of the network that consumes.

Because of this the output impedance is sometimes referred to as the source impedance or internal impedance.

Circuit to the left of central set of open circles models the source circuit, while circuit to the right models the connected circuit. Z_{S} is output impedance as seen by the load, and Z_{L} is input impedance as seen by the source.

== Description ==
All devices and connections have non-zero resistance and reactance, and therefore no device can be a perfect source. The output impedance is often used to model the source's response to current flow. Some portion of the device's measured output impedance may not physically exist within the device; some are artifacts that are due to the chemical, thermodynamic, or mechanical properties of the source. This impedance can be imagined as an impedance in series with an ideal voltage source, or in parallel with an ideal current source (see: Series and parallel circuits).

Sources are modeled as ideal sources (ideal meaning sources that always keep the desired value) combined with their output impedance. The output impedance is defined as this modeled and/or real impedance in series with an ideal voltage source. Mathematically, current and voltage sources can be converted to each other using Thévenin's theorem and Norton's theorem.

In the case of a nonlinear device, such as a transistor, the term "output impedance" usually refers to the effect upon a small-amplitude signal, and will vary with the bias point of the transistor, that is, with the direct current (DC) and voltage applied to the device.

== Measurement ==
The source resistance of a purely resistive device can be experimentally determined by increasingly loading the device until the voltage across the load (AC or DC) is one half of the open circuit voltage. At this point, the load resistance and internal resistance are equal.

It can more accurately be described by keeping track of the voltage vs current curves for various loads, and calculating the resistance from Ohm's law. (The internal resistance may not be the same for different types of loading or at different frequencies, especially in devices like chemical batteries.)

The generalized source impedance for a reactive (inductive or capacitive) source device is more complicated to determine, and is usually measured with specialized instruments, rather than taking many measurements by hand.

== Audio amplifiers ==
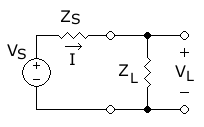

The real output impedance (Z_{S}) of a power amplifier is usually less than 0.1 Ω, but this is rarely specified. Instead it is "hidden" within the damping factor parameter, which is:

$$DF = \frac{Z_\mathrm{L}}{Z_\mathrm{S}}$$

Solving for Z_{S},

$$Z_\mathrm{S} = \frac{Z_\mathrm{L}}{DF}$$

gives the small source impedance (output impedance) of the power amplifier. This can be calculated from the Z_{L} of the loudspeaker (typically 2, 4, or 8 ohms) and the given value of the damping factor.

Generally in audio and hifi, the input impedance of components is several times (technically, more than 10) the output impedance of the device connected to them. This is called impedance bridging or voltage bridging.

In this case, Z_{L}>> Z_{S}, (in practice:) DF > 10

In video, RF, and other systems, impedances of inputs and outputs are the same. This is called impedance matching or a matched connection.

In this case, Z_{S} = Z_{L}, DF = 1/1 = 1 .

The actual output impedance for most devices is not the same as the rated output impedance. A power amplifier may have a rated impedance of 8 ohms, but the actual output impedance will vary depending on circuit conditions. The rated output impedance is the impedance into which the amplifier can deliver its maximum amount of power without failing.

== Batteries ==
Internal resistance is a concept that helps model the electrical consequences of the complex chemical reactions inside a battery. It is impossible to directly measure the internal resistance of a battery, but it can be calculated from current and voltage data measured from a circuit. When a load is applied to a battery, the internal resistance can be calculated from the following equations:

$$\begin{align}
R_B &= \left( \frac{Vs}{I} \right) - R_L \\
&=        \frac{V_S - V_L}{I}
\end{align}$$

where

$R_B$ is the internal resistance of the battery
$V_S$ is the battery voltage without a load
$V_L$ is the battery voltage with a load
$R_L$ is the total resistance of the circuit
$I$ is the total current supplied by the battery

Internal resistance varies with the age of a battery, but for most commercial batteries the internal resistance is on the order of 1 ohm.

When there is a current through a cell, the measured e.m.f. is lower than when there is no current delivered by the cell. The reason for this is that part of the available energy of the cell is used up to drive charges through the cell. This energy is wasted by the so-called "internal resistance" of that cell. This wasted energy shows up as lost voltage. Internal resistance is $r=\frac{E - V_L}{I}$.

== See also ==
- Electrical impedance
- Input impedance
- Nominal impedance
- Damping factor
- Voltage divider
- Early effect small-signal model
- Equivalent series resistance
- Power gain
