= Voltage divider =

Linear circuit that produces an output voltage that is a fraction of its input voltage

In electronics, a voltage divider (also known as a potential divider) is a passive linear circuit that produces an output voltage (V_{out}) that is a fraction of its input voltage (V_{in}). Voltage division is the result of distributing the input voltage among the components of the divider. A simple example of a voltage divider is two resistors connected in series, with the input voltage applied across the resistor pair and the output voltage emerging from the connection between them.

Resistor voltage dividers are commonly used to create reference voltages, or to reduce the magnitude of a voltage so it can be measured, and may also be used as signal attenuators at low alternating current frequencies. For direct current and relatively low alternating current frequencies, a voltage divider may be sufficiently accurate if made only of resistors; where frequency response over a wide range is required (such as in an oscilloscope probe), a voltage divider may have capacitive elements added to compensate load capacitance. In electric power transmission, a capacitive voltage divider is used for measurement of high voltage.

== General case ==
Figure 1: A simple voltage divider

A voltage divider referenced to ground is created by connecting two electrical impedances in series, as shown in Figure 1. The input voltage is applied across the series impedances Z_{1} and Z_{2} and the output is the voltage across Z_{2}. Z_{1} and Z_{2} may be composed of any combination of elements such as resistors, inductors and capacitors.

If the current in the output wire is zero (I_{out}=0) then the relationship between the input voltage, V_{in}, and the output voltage, V_{out}, is:

$$V_\mathrm{out} = \frac{Z_2}{Z_1+Z_2} \cdot V_\mathrm{in}$$

Proof (using Ohm's law):

$$V_\mathrm{in} = I\cdot(Z_1+Z_2)$$
$$V_\mathrm{out} = I\cdot Z_2$$
$$I = \frac {V_\mathrm{in}}{Z_1+Z_2}$$
$$V_\mathrm{out} = V_\mathrm{in} \cdot\frac {Z_2}{Z_1+Z_2}$$

The transfer function (also known as the divider's voltage ratio) of this circuit is:

$$H = \frac {V_\mathrm{out}}{V_\mathrm{in}} = \frac{Z_2}{Z_1+Z_2}$$

In general this transfer function is a complex, rational function of frequency.

== Examples ==
=== Resistive divider ===
Figure 2: Simple resistive voltage divider

A resistive divider is the case where both impedances, Z_{1} and Z_{2}, are purely resistive (Figure 2).

Substituting Z_{1} = R_{1} and Z_{2} = R_{2} into the previous expression gives:

$$V_\mathrm{out} = \frac{R_2}{R_1+R_2} \cdot V_\mathrm{in}$$

If R_{1} = R_{2} then

$$V_\mathrm{out} = \frac{1}{2} \cdot V_\mathrm{in}$$

If V_{out} = 6 V and V_{in} = 9 V (both commonly used voltages), then:

$$\frac{V_\mathrm{out}}{V_\mathrm{in}} = \frac{R_2}{R_1+R_2} = \frac{6}{9} = \frac{2}{3}$$

and by solving using algebra, R_{2} must be twice the value of R_{1}.

To solve for R_{1}:

$$R_1 = \frac{R_2 \cdot V_\mathrm{in}}{V_\mathrm{out}} - R_2 = R_2 \cdot \left({\frac{V_\mathrm{in}}{V_\mathrm{out}}-1}\right)$$

To solve for R_{2}:

$$R_2 = R_1 \cdot \frac{1} {\left({\frac{V_\mathrm{in}}{V_\mathrm{out}}-1}\right)}$$

Any ratio V_{out} / V_{in} greater than 1 is not possible. That is, using resistors alone it is not possible to either invert the voltage or increase V_{out} above V_{in}.

=== Low-pass RC filter ===
Figure 3: Resistor/capacitor voltage divider

Consider a divider consisting of a resistor and capacitor as shown in Figure 3.

Comparing with the general case, we see Z_{1} = R and Z_{2} is the impedance of the capacitor, given by

$$Z_2 = -\mathrm{j}X_{\mathrm{C}} =\frac{1}{\mathrm{j} \omega C} \ ,$$

where X_{C} is the reactance of the capacitor, C is the capacitance of the capacitor, j is the imaginary unit, and ω (omega) is the radian frequency of the input voltage.

This divider will then have the voltage ratio:

$$\frac{V_\mathrm{out}}{V_\mathrm{in}}
= \frac{Z_\mathrm{2}}{Z_\mathrm{1} + Z_\mathrm{2}}
= \frac{\frac{1}{\mathrm{j} \omega C}}{\frac{1}{\mathrm{j} \omega C} + R}
= \frac{1}{1 + \mathrm{j} \omega R C} \ .$$

The product τ (tau) = RC is called the time constant of the circuit.

The ratio then depends on frequency, in this case decreasing as frequency increases. This circuit is, in fact, a basic (first-order) low-pass filter. The ratio contains an imaginary number, and actually contains both the amplitude and phase shift information of the filter. To extract just the amplitude ratio, calculate the magnitude of the ratio, that is:

$$\left| \frac{V_\mathrm{out}}{V_\mathrm{in}} \right| = \frac{1}{\sqrt{1 + (\omega R C)^2}} \ .$$

=== Inductive divider ===
Inductive dividers split AC input according to inductance:

$V_\mathrm{out} = \frac{L_2}{L_1 + L_2} \cdot V_\mathrm{in}$

(with components in the same positions as Figure 2.)

The above equation is for non-interacting inductors; mutual inductance (as in an autotransformer) will alter the results.

Inductive dividers split AC input according to the reactance of the elements as for the resistive divider above.

=== Capacitive divider ===
Capacitive dividers do not pass DC input.

For an AC input a simple capacitive equation is:

$V_\mathrm{out} = \frac{Xc_2}{Xc_1 + Xc_2} \cdot V_\mathrm{in} = \frac{1/C_2}{1/C_1 + 1/C_2} \cdot V_\mathrm{in} = \frac{C_1}{C_1 + C_2} \cdot V_\mathrm{in}$

(with components in the same positions as Figure 2.)

Any leakage current in the capactive elements requires use of the generalized expression with two impedances. By selection of parallel R and C elements in the proper proportions, the same division ratio can be maintained over a useful range of frequencies. This is the principle applied in compensated oscilloscope probes to increase measurement bandwidth.

== Loading effect ==
The output voltage of a voltage divider will vary according to the electric current it is supplying to its external electrical load. The effective source impedance coming from a divider of Z_{1} and Z_{2}, as above, will be Z_{1} in parallel with Z_{2} (sometimes written Z_{1} || Z_{2}), that is: (Z_{1} Z_{2}) / (Z_{1} + Z_{2}) = HZ_{1}.

To obtain a sufficiently stable output voltage, the output current must either be stable (and so be made part of the calculation of the potential divider values) or limited to an appropriately small percentage of the divider's input current. Load sensitivity can be decreased by reducing the impedance of both halves of the divider, though this increases the divider's quiescent input current and results in higher power consumption (and wasted heat) in the divider. Voltage regulators are often used in lieu of passive voltage dividers when it is necessary to accommodate high or fluctuating load currents.

== Applications ==
Voltage dividers are used for adjusting the level of a signal, for bias of active devices in amplifiers, and for measurement of voltages. A Wheatstone bridge and a multimeter both include voltage dividers. A potentiometer is used as a variable voltage divider in the volume control of many radios.

=== Sensor measurement ===
Voltage dividers can be used to allow a microcontroller to measure the resistance of a sensor. The sensor is wired in series with a known resistance to form a voltage divider and a known voltage is applied across the divider. The microcontroller's analog-to-digital converter is connected to the center tap of the divider so that it can measure the tap voltage and, by using the measured voltage and the known resistance and voltage, compute the sensor resistance. This technique is commonly used to measure the resistance of temperature sensors such as thermistors and RTDs.

Another example that is commonly used involves a potentiometer (variable resistor) as one of the resistive elements. When the shaft of the potentiometer is rotated the resistance it produces either increases or decreases, the change in resistance corresponds to the angular change of the shaft. If coupled with a stable voltage reference, the output voltage can be fed into an analog-to-digital converter and a display can show the angle. Such circuits are commonly used in reading control knobs.

=== High voltage measurement ===
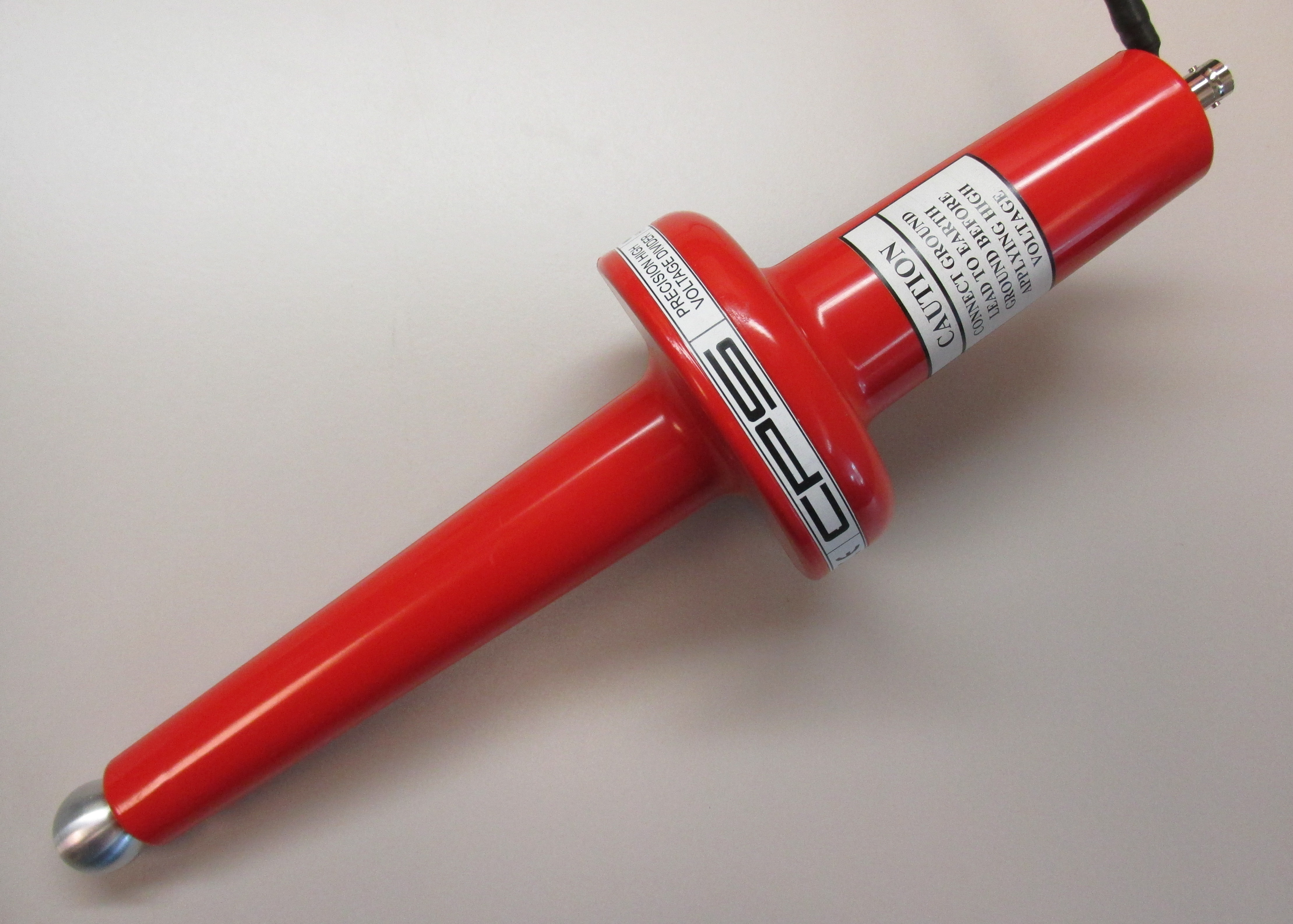
High voltage (HV) resistor divider probe. The HV to be measured (V_{in}) is applied to the corona ball probe tip and ground is connected to the other end of the divider via the black cable. The divider output (V_{out}) appears on the connector adjacent to the cable.

A voltage divider can be used to scale down a very high voltage so that it can be measured by a volt meter. The high voltage is applied across the divider, and the divider output—which outputs a lower voltage that is within the meter's input range—is measured by the meter. High voltage resistor divider probes designed specifically for this purpose can be used to measure voltages up to 100 kV. Special high-voltage resistors are used in such probes as they must be able to tolerate high input voltages and, to produce accurate results, must have matched temperature coefficients and very low voltage coefficients (ratio of resistance change to applied voltage change). Capacitive divider probes are typically used for voltages above 100 kV, as the heat caused by power losses in resistor divider probes at such high voltages could be excessive.

=== Logic level shifting ===
A voltage divider can be used as a crude logic level shifter to interface two circuits that use different operating voltages. For example, some logic circuits operate at 5 V whereas others operate at 3.3 V. Directly interfacing a 5 V logic output to a 3.3 V input may cause permanent damage to the 3.3 V circuit. In this case, a voltage divider with an output ratio of 3.3/5 might be used to reduce the 5 V signal to 3.3 V, to allow the circuits to interoperate without damaging the 3.3 V circuit. For this to be feasible, the 5 V source impedance and 3.3 V input impedance must be negligible, or they must be constant and the divider resistor values must account for their impedances. If the input impedance is capacitive, a purely resistive divider will limit the data rate.

== See also ==
- Current divider
- DC-to-DC converter
- Voltage amplifier
