= Fully differential amplifier =

DC-coupled high-gain electronic voltage amplifier with differential inputs and outputs

A fully differential amplifier (FDA) is a DC-coupled high-gain electronic voltage amplifier with differential inputs and outputs. In its ordinary usage, the output of the FDA is controlled by two feedback paths which, because of the amplifier's high gain, almost completely determine the output voltage for any given input.

In a fully differential amplifier, common-mode noise such as power supply disturbances is rejected; this makes FDAs especially useful as part of a mixed-signal integrated circuit.

An FDA is often used to convert an analog signal into a form more suitable for driving into an analog-to-digital converter; many modern high-precision ADCs have differential inputs.

== The ideal FDA ==
For any input voltages, the ideal FDA has infinite open-loop gain, infinite bandwidth, infinite input impedance resulting in zero input currents, infinite slew rate, zero output impedance and zero noise.

In the ideal FDA, the difference in the output voltages is equal to the difference between the input voltages multiplied by the gain. The common mode voltage of the output voltages is not dependent on the input voltage. In many cases, the common mode voltage can be directly set by a third voltage input.

- Input voltage: $V_\mathrm{id} = V_\mathrm{in+} - V_\mathrm{in-}$
- Output voltage: $V_\mathrm{od} = V_\mathrm{out+} - V_\mathrm{out-} = V_\mathrm{id} \times \mathrm{Gain}$
- Output common-mode voltage: $V_\mathrm{oc} = \frac{(V_\mathrm{out+})+(V_\mathrm{out-})}{2}$

A real FDA can only approximate this ideal, and the actual parameters are subject to drift over time and with changes in temperature, input conditions, etc. Modern integrated FET or MOSFET FDAs approximate more closely to these ideals than bipolar ICs where large signals must be handled at room temperature over a limited bandwidth; input impedance, in particular, is much higher, although the bipolar FDA usually exhibit superior (i.e., lower) input offset drift and noise characteristics.

Where the limitations of real devices can be ignored, an FDA can be viewed as a Black Box with gain; circuit function and parameters are determined by feedback, usually negative. An FDA, as implemented in practice, is moderately complex integrated circuit.

== Limitations of real FDAs ==
=== DC imperfections ===
- Finite gain — the effect is most pronounced when the overall design attempts to achieve gain close to the inherent gain of the FDA.
- Finite input resistance — this puts an upper bound on the resistances in the feedback circuit.
- Nonzero output resistance — important for low resistance loads. Except for very small voltage output, power considerations usually come into play first. (Output impedance is inversely proportional to the idle current in the output stage — very low idle current results in very high output impedance.)
- Input bias current — a small amount of current (typically ~10 nA for bipolar FDAs, or picoamperes for CMOS designs) flows into the inputs. This current is mismatched slightly between the inverting and non-inverting inputs (there is an input offset current). This effect is usually important only for very low-power circuits.
- Input offset voltage — the FDA will produce an output even when the input pins are at exactly the same voltage. For circuits that require precise DC operation, this effect must be compensated for.
- Common mode gain — A perfect operational amplifier amplifies only the voltage difference between its two inputs, completely rejecting all voltages that are common to both. However, the differential input stage of an FDA is never perfect, leading to the amplification of these identical voltages to some degree. The standard measure of this defect is called the common-mode rejection ratio (denoted, CMRR). Minimization of common mode gain is usually important in non-inverting amplifiers (described below) that operate at high amplification.
- Temperature effects — all parameters change with temperature. The temperature drift of the input offset voltage is especially important.

=== AC imperfections ===
- Finite bandwidth — all amplifiers have a finite bandwidth. This is because FDAs use internal frequency compensation to increase the phase margin.
- Input capacitance — most important for high-frequency operation because it further reduces the open loop bandwidth of the amplifier.
- Common mode gain — See DC imperfections, above.
- Noise - all real electronic components generate noise.

=== Nonlinear imperfections ===
- Saturation — output voltage is limited to a peak value, usually slightly less than the power supply voltage. Saturation occurs when the differential input voltage is too high for the op-amp's gain, driving the output level to that peak value.
- Slewing — the amplifier's output voltage reaches its maximum rate of change. Measured as the slew rate, it is usually specified in volts per microsecond. When slewing occurs, further increases in the input signal have no effect on the rate of change of the output. Slewing is usually caused by internal capacitances in the amplifier, especially those used to implement its frequency compensation, particularly using pole splitting.
- Non-linear transfer function — The output voltage may not be accurately proportional to the difference between the input voltages. It is commonly called distortion when the input signal is a waveform. This effect will be very small in a practical circuit if substantial negative feedback is used.

=== Power considerations ===
- Limited output power — if high power output is desired, an op-amp specifically designed for that purpose must be used. Most op-amps are designed for low-power operation and are typically only able to drive output resistances down to 2 kΩ.
- Limited output current — the output current must obviously be finite. In practice, most op-amps are designed to limit the output current to not exceed a specified level, thus protecting the FDA and associated circuitry from damage.

== DC behavior ==
Open-loop gain is defined as the amplification from input to output without any feedback applied. For most practical calculations, the open-loop gain is assumed to be infinite; in reality, it is obviously not. Typical devices exhibit open-loop DC gain ranging from 100,000 to over 1 million; this is sufficiently large for circuit gain to be determined almost entirely by the amount of negative feedback used. Op-amps have performance limits that the designer must keep in mind and sometimes workaround. In particular, instability is possible in a DC amplifier if AC aspects are neglected.

== AC behavior ==
The FDA gain calculated at DC does not apply at higher frequencies. To a first approximation, the gain of a typical FDA is inversely proportional to frequency. This means that an FDA is characterized by its gain-bandwidth product. For example, an FDA with a gain bandwidth product of 1 MHz would have a gain of 5 at 200 kHz, and a gain of 1 at 1 MHz. This low-pass characteristic is introduced deliberately because it tends to stabilize the circuit by introducing a dominant pole. This is known as frequency compensation.

A typical low-cost general-purpose FDA will have a gain-bandwidth product of a few megahertz. Specialty and high-speed FDAs can achieve gain-bandwidth products of hundreds of megahertz. Some FDAs are even capable of gain-bandwidth products greater than a gigahertz.

== See also ==
- Active filter
- Analog computer
- Current-feedback operational amplifier
- Instrumentation amplifier
- Operational amplifier applications
- Operational transconductance amplifier
