= V/s =

v/s may refer to:

- V/S, a Ship prefix
- V/s or Volts/second, unit of slew rate
