= Phase margin =

Parameter of electronic amplifiers

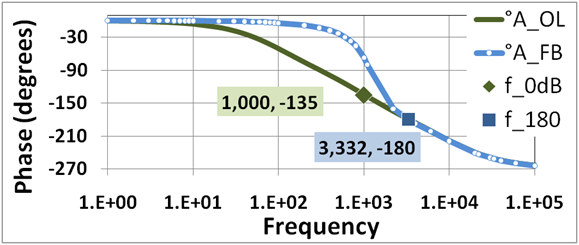
Bode plot illustrating phase margin

In electronic amplifiers, the phase margin (PM) is the difference between the phase lag φ (< 0) and -180°, for an amplifier's output signal (relative to its input) at zero dB gain - i.e. unity gain, or that the output signal has the same amplitude as the input.

$$\mathrm{PM} = \varphi-(-180^\circ)$$.

For example, if the amplifier's open-loop gain crosses 0 dB at a frequency where the phase lag is -135°, then the phase margin of this feedback system is -135° -(-180°) = 45°. See Bode plot#Gain margin and phase margin for more details.

== Theory ==
Typically the open-loop phase lag (relative to input, φ < 0) varies with frequency, progressively increasing to exceed 180°, at which frequency the output signal becomes inverted, or antiphase in relation to the input. The PM will be positive but decreasing at frequencies less than the frequency at which inversion sets in (at which PM = 0), and PM is negative (PM < 0) at higher frequencies. In the presence of negative feedback, a zero or negative PM at a frequency where the loop gain exceeds unity (1) guarantees instability. Thus positive PM is a "safety margin" that ensures proper (non-oscillatory) operation of the circuit. This applies to amplifier circuits as well as more generally, to active filters, under various load conditions (e.g. reactive loads). In its simplest form, involving ideal negative feedback voltage amplifiers with non-reactive feedback, the phase margin is measured at the frequency where the open-loop voltage gain of the amplifier equals the desired closed-loop DC voltage gain.

More generally, PM is defined as that of the amplifier and its feedback network combined (the "loop", normally opened at the amplifier input), measured at a frequency where the loop gain is unity, and prior to the closing of the loop, through tying the output of the open loop to the input source, in such a way as to subtract from it.

In the above loop-gain definition, it is assumed that the amplifier input presents zero load. To make this work for non-zero-load input, the output of the feedback network needs to be loaded with an equivalent load for the purpose of determining the frequency response of the loop gain.

It is also assumed that the graph of gain vs. frequency crosses unity gain with a negative slope and does so only once. This consideration matters only with reactive and active feedback networks, as may be the case with active filters.

Phase margin and its important companion concept, gain margin, are measures of stability in closed-loop, dynamic-control systems. Phase margin indicates relative stability, the tendency to oscillate during its damped response to an input change such as a step function. Gain margin indicates absolute stability and the degree to which the system will oscillate, without limit, given any disturbance.

The output signals of all amplifiers exhibit a time delay when compared to their input signals. This delay causes a phase difference between the amplifier's input and output signals. If there are enough stages in the amplifier, at some frequency, the output signal will lag behind the input signal by one cycle period at that frequency. In this situation, the amplifier's output signal will be in phase with its input signal though lagging behind it by 360°, i.e., the output will have a phase angle of −360°. This lag is of great consequence in amplifiers that use feedback. The reason being that the amplifier will oscillate if the fed-back output signal is in phase with the input signal at the frequency at which its open-loop voltage gain equals its closed-loop voltage gain, as long as the open-loop voltage gain is one or greater. The oscillation will occur because the fed-back output signal will then reinforce the input signal at that frequency. In conventional operational amplifiers, the critical output phase angle is −180° because the output is fed back to the input through an inverting input which adds an additional −180°.

== Phase Margin, Gain margin and relation with feedback stability ==
Phase margin and gain margin are two measures of stability for a feedback control system. They indicate how much the gain or the phase of the system can vary before it becomes unstable. Phase margin is the difference (expressed as a positive number) between 180° and the phase shift where the magnitude of the loop transfer function is 0 dB. It is the additional phase shift that can be tolerated, with no gain change, while remaining stable. Gain margin is the difference (expressed as a positive dB value) between 0 dB and the magnitude of the loop transfer function at the frequency where the phase shift is 180°. It is the amount of gain, which can be increased or decreased without making the system unstable. For a stable system, both the margins should be positive, or the phase margin should be greater than the gain margin. For a marginally stable system, the margins should be zero or the phase margin should be equal to the gain margin. You can use Bode plots to graphically determine the gain margin and phase margin of a system. A Bode plot maps the frequency response of the system through two graphs – the Bode magnitude plot (expressing the magnitude in decibels) and the Bode phase plot (expressing the phase shift in degrees).

== Practice ==
In practice, feedback amplifiers must be designed with phase margins substantially in excess of 0°, even though amplifiers with phase margins of, say, 1° are theoretically stable. The reason is that many practical factors can reduce the phase margin below the theoretical minimum. A prime example is when the amplifier's output is connected to a capacitive load. Therefore, operational amplifiers are usually compensated to achieve a minimum phase margin of 45° or so. This means that at the frequency at which the open and closed loop gains meet, the phase angle is −135°. The calculation is: -135° - (-180°) = 45°. See Warwick or Stout for a detailed analysis of the techniques and results of compensation to ensure adequate phase margins. See also the article "Pole splitting". Often amplifiers are designed to achieve a typical phase margin of 60 degrees. If the typical phase margin is around 60 degrees then the minimum phase margin will typically be greater than 45 degrees. An amplifier with lower phase margin will ring (Note: Ringing is the displaying of a decaying oscillation for a portion of the output signal's cycle; see ringing artifacts.) for longer and an amplifier with more phase margin will take a longer time to rise to the voltage step's final level.

== See also ==
- Barkhausen stability criterion
- BIBO stability
- Nyquist stability criterion
- Routh–Hurwitz stability criterion
- Ringing artifacts
- Root locus method
- Bode plots & phase margin
- Step response & phase margin
