= Rohm =

Japanese semiconductor company

Rohm Co., Ltd.
- Company logo used since 2009

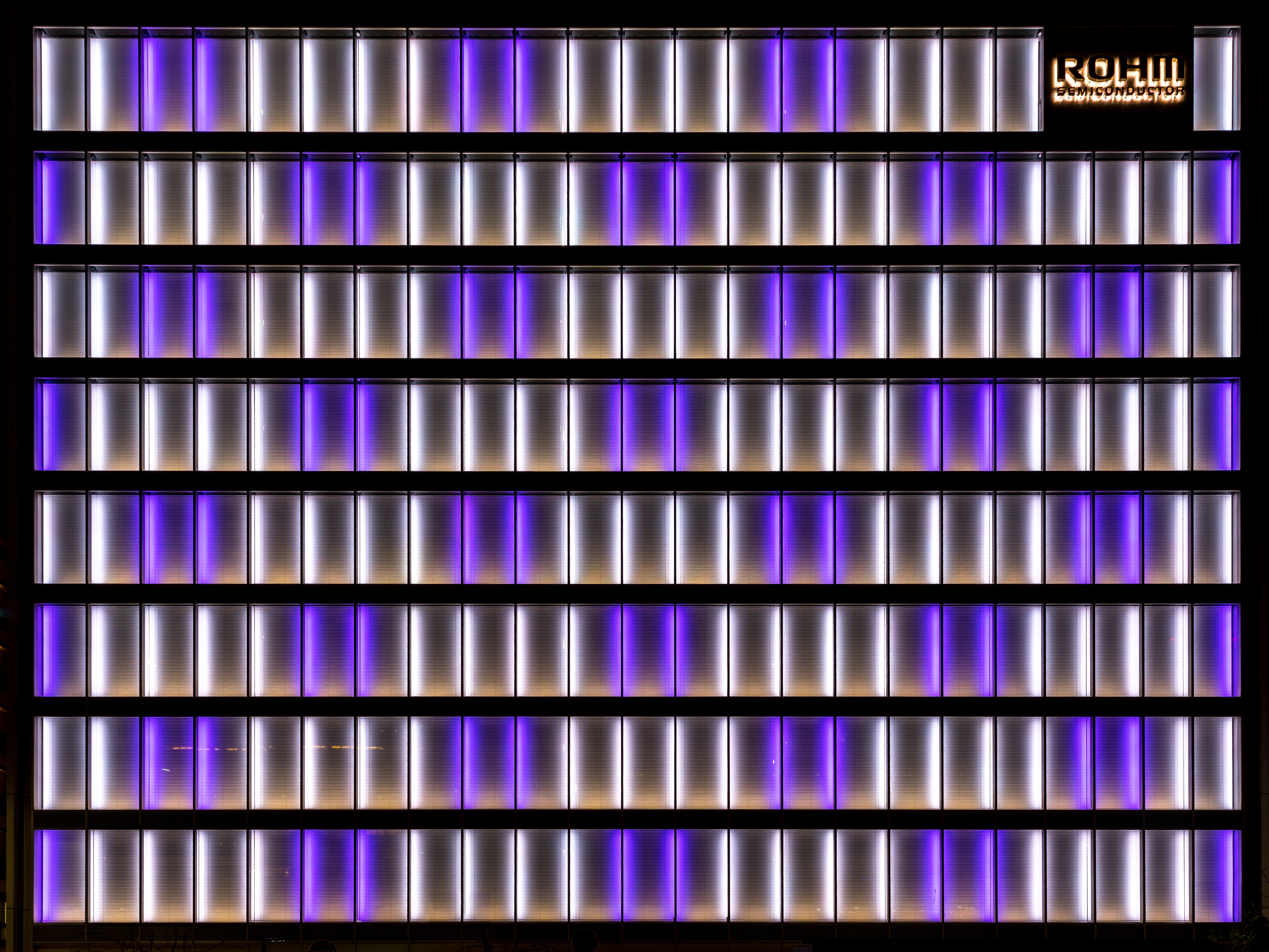
- Illuminated white and purple facade of the office building Rohm Semiconductor in Kyoto
- Native name: ローム株式会社
- Type: Public
- Traded as: TYO: 6963; OSE: 6963
- Industry: Electronics; Semiconductor
- Founded: September 17, 1958; 68 years ago, in Kyoto, Japan
- Founder: Kenichiro Sato
- Headquarters: 21 Saiin Mizosaki-cho, Ukyo-ku, Kyoto 615-8585 Japan
- Area served: Worldwide
- Key people: Tadanobu Fujiwara, (CEO and president)
- Products: LSIs; Semiconductor; Discrete semiconductors; Optoelectronics; Passive components; LED lighting
- Revenue: ▼¥ 352,010 million (FY 2017) (¥ 352,369 million) (FY 2016)
- Operating income: ▲¥ 31,828 million (FY 2017) (¥ 25,686 million) (FY 2016)
- Net income: ▲¥ 26,450 million (FY 2017) (¥ 25,702 million) (FY 2016)
- Total assets: ▲¥ 834,503 million (FY 2017) (¥ 804,134 million) (FY 2016)
- Total equity: ▲¥ 725,453 million (FY 2017) (¥ 706,251 million) (FY 2016)
- Number of employees: 21,308 (as of March 31, 2017)
- Website: Official website

Rohm Co., Ltd (ローム株式会社, Rōmu Kabushiki-gaisha) (styled as ROHM) is a Japanese electronic parts manufacturer based in Kyoto, Japan. Rohm was incorporated as Toyo Electronics Industry Corporation by Kenichiro Sato (佐藤 研一郎) on September 17, 1958.

The company was originally called R.ohm, which was derived from R for resistors, the original product, plus ohm, the unit of measure for resistance.

The name of the company was officially changed to Rohm in 1979 and then changed again to Rohm Semiconductor in January 2009.

When Rohm was established, resistors were its main product. Later, the company began manufacturing semiconductors. ICs and discrete semiconductors now account for about 80% of Rohm's revenue.

Through 2012, Rohm was among the top 20 semiconductor sales leaders.

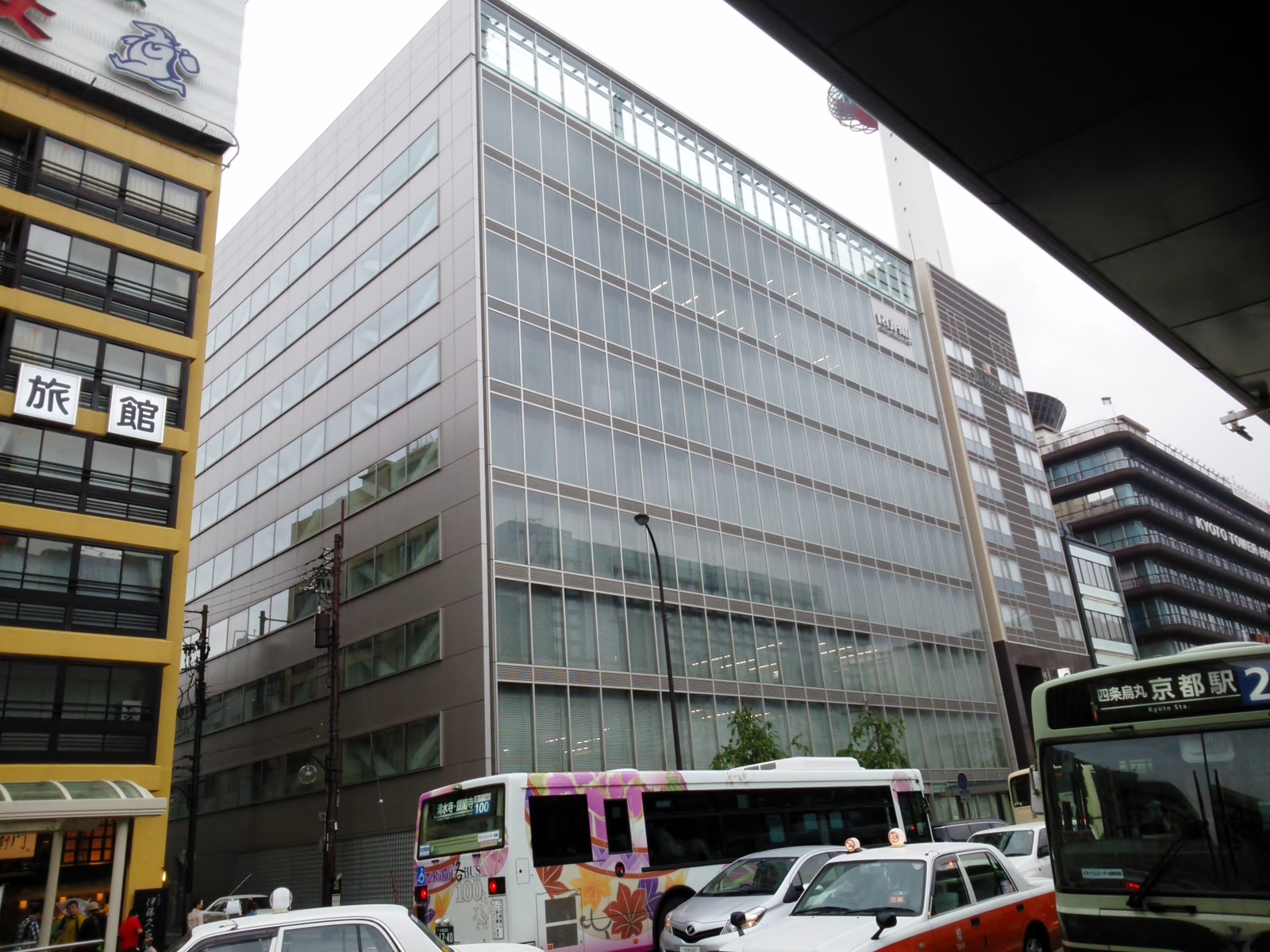
Rohm office building in Kyoto

== International expansion ==
In 2016, Rohm started the construction of its production facility in Kelantan, Malaysia and commenced the operation in April 2017. A few years later in 2022, Rohm expanded its facility by approximately 1.5 times bigger with the plan to start operating in 2023. The original plant mainly focuses on the production of discrete semiconductors such as diodes while the expanded facility will be focusing on the production of analog LSIs and transistors.

== Products ==
Rohm produces a range of products such as power stage ICs aimed at power supplies, CMOS operational amplifier used to boost sensor-signals as well as Hall-effect sensors. The company also sells DC to DC controller ICs, current sensor ICs and AC to DC converters.

FeRAM and other LSI integrated circuits are designed and manufactured by the Lapis Semiconductor division of Rohm, formerly OKI Semiconductor, a division of Oki Electric.
