= Pole splitting =

Pole splitting is a phenomenon exploited in some forms of frequency compensation used in an electronic amplifier. When a capacitor is introduced between the input and output sides of the amplifier with the intention of moving the pole lowest in frequency (usually an input pole) to lower frequencies, pole splitting causes the pole next in frequency (usually an output pole) to move to a higher frequency. This pole movement increases the stability of the amplifier and improves its step response at the cost of decreased speed.

== Example of pole splitting ==
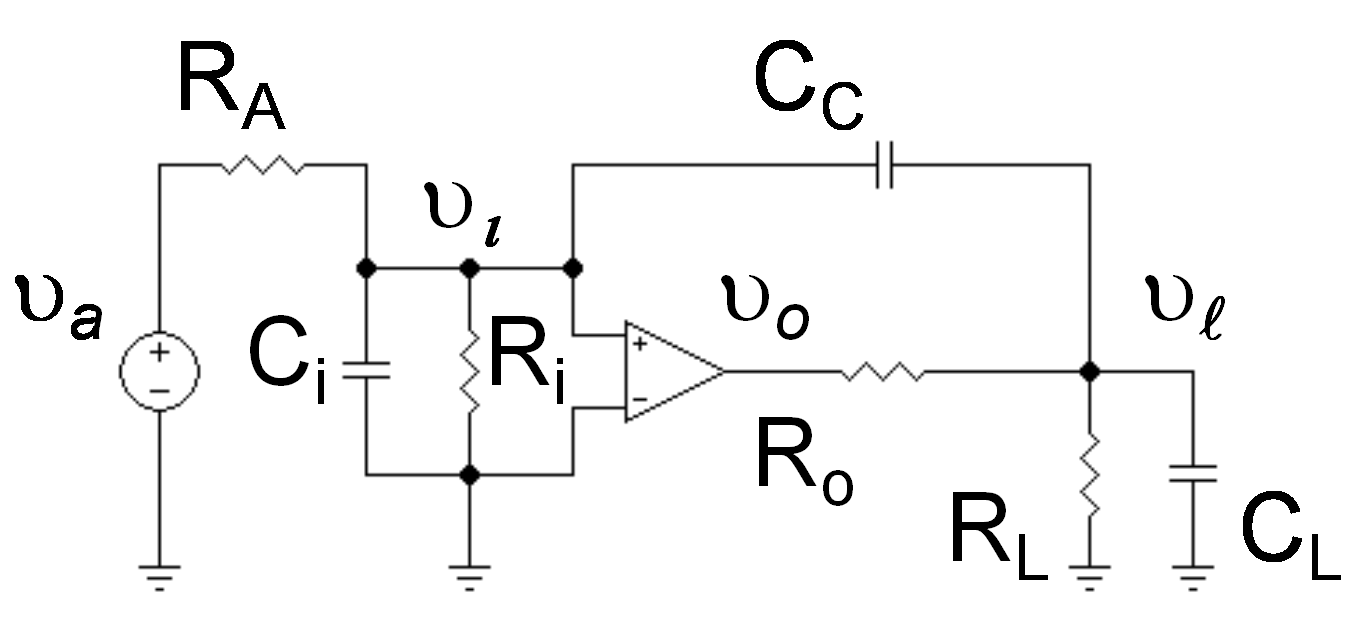
Figure 1: Operational amplifier with compensation capacitor C_{C} between input and output; notice the amplifier has both input impedance R_{i} and output impedance R_{o}. (edit: This figure is faulty, as the + and - signs should be switched. There needs to be negative feedback.)

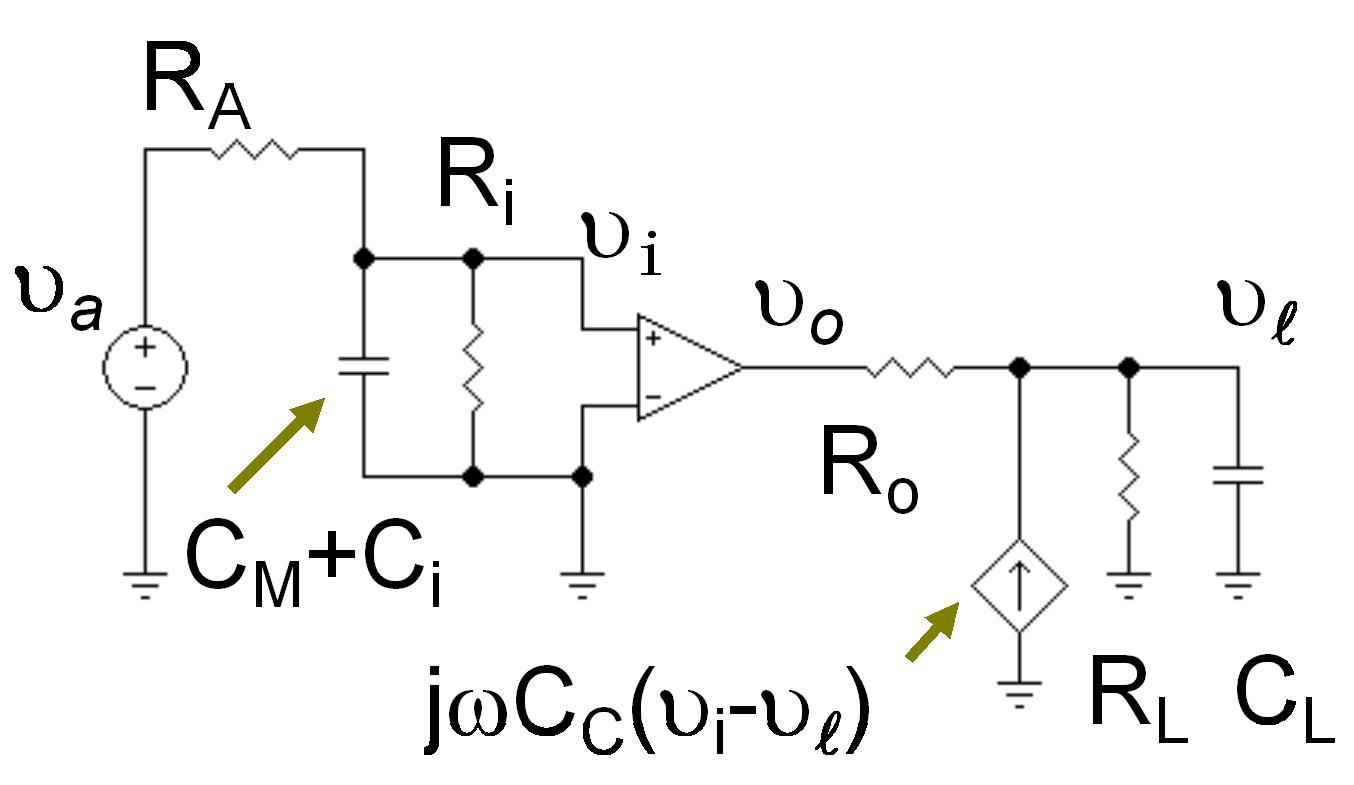
Figure 2: Operational amplifier with compensation capacitor transformed using Miller's theorem to replace the compensation capacitor with a Miller capacitor at the input and a frequency-dependent current source at the output. (edit: This figure is faulty, as the + and - signs should be switched. There needs to be negative feedback.)

This example shows that introducing capacitor C_{C} in the amplifier of Figure 1 has two results: firstly, it causes the lowest frequency pole of the amplifier to move still lower in frequency and secondly, it causes the higher pole to move higher in frequency. This amplifier has a low frequency pole due to the added input resistance R_{i} and capacitance C_{i}, with the time constant C_{i} ( R_{A} || R_{i} ). This pole is lowered in frequency by the Miller effect. The amplifier is given a high frequency output pole by addition of the load resistance R_{L} and capacitance C_{L}, with the time constant C_{L} ( R_{o} || R_{L} ). The upward movement of the high-frequency pole occurs because the Miller-amplified compensation capacitor C_{C} alters the frequency dependence of the output voltage divider.

The first objective, to show the lowest pole decreases in frequency, is established using the same approach as the Miller's theorem article. Following the procedure there, Figure 1 is transformed to the electrically equivalent circuit of Figure 2. Application of Kirchhoff's current law to the input side of Figure 2 determines the input voltage $\ v_i$ to the ideal op amp as a function of the applied signal voltage $\ v_a$, namely,

$$\frac {v_i} {v_a}  =  \frac {R_i} {R_i+R_A} \frac {1} {1+j \omega (C_M+C_i) (R_A\|R_i)} \ ,$$

which exhibits a roll-off with frequency beginning at f_{1} where

$$\begin{align}
f_{1} & =  \frac {1} {2 \pi (C_M+C_i)(R_A\|R_i) } \\
& =  \frac {1} {2 \pi \tau_1} \ , \\
\end{align}$$

which introduces notation $\tau_1$ for the time constant of the lowest pole. This frequency is lower than the initial low frequency of the amplifier, which for C_{C} = 0 F is $\frac {1} {2 \pi C_i (R_A\|R_i)}$.

Turning to the second objective, showing the higher pole increases in frequency, consider the output side of the circuit, which contributes a second factor to the overall gain, and additional frequency dependence. The voltage $\ v_o$ is determined by the gain of the ideal op amp inside the amplifier as

$$\  v_o = A_v v_i \ .$$

Using this relation and applying Kirchhoff's current law to the output side of the circuit determines the load voltage $v_{\ell}$ as a function of the voltage $\ v_{i}$ at the input to the ideal op amp as:

$\frac {v_{\ell}} {v_i} = A_v \frac {R_L} {R_L+R_o}\,\!$$\sdot \frac {1+j \omega C_C R_o/A_v } {1+j \omega (C_L + C_C ) (R_o\|R_L) } \ .$

This expression is combined with the gain factor found earlier for the input side of the circuit to obtain the overall gain as

$$\frac {v_{\ell}} {v_a}  = \frac {v_{\ell}}{v_i} \frac {v_i} {v_a}$$

$= A_v \frac {R_i} {R_i+R_A}\sdot \frac {R_L} {R_L+R_o}\,\!$$\sdot \frac {1} {1+j \omega (C_M+C_i) (R_A\|R_i)} \,\!$$\sdot \frac {1+j \omega C_C R_o/A_v } {1+j \omega (C_L + C_C ) (R_o\|R_L) } \ .$

This gain formula appears to show a simple two-pole response with two time constants. It also exhibits a zero in the numerator but, assuming the amplifier gain A_{v} is large, this zero is important only at frequencies too high to matter in this discussion, so the numerator can be approximated as unity. However, although the amplifier does have a two-pole behavior, the two time-constants are more complicated than the above expression suggests because the Miller capacitance contains a buried frequency dependence that has no importance at low frequencies, but has considerable effect at high frequencies. That is, assuming the output R-C product, C_{L} ( R_{o} || R_{L} ), corresponds to a frequency well above the low frequency pole, the accurate form of the Miller capacitance must be used, rather than the Miller approximation. According to the article on Miller effect, the Miller capacitance is given by

$$\begin{align}
C_M & = C_C \left( 1 - \frac {v_{\ell}} {v_i} \right) \\
& = C_C \left( 1 - A_v \frac {R_L} {R_L+R_o} \frac {1+j \omega C_C R_o/A_v } {1+j \omega (C_L + C_C ) (R_o\|R_L) } \right ) \ . \\
\end{align}$$

For a positive Miller capacitance, A_{v} is negative. Upon substitution of this result into the gain expression and collecting terms, the gain is rewritten as:

$$\frac {v_{\ell}} {v_a} = A_v  \frac {R_i} {R_i+R_A} \frac {R_L} {R_L+R_o}  \frac {1+j \omega C_C R_o/A_v } {D_{ \omega }} \ ,$$

with D_{ω} given by a quadratic in ω, namely:

$D_{ \omega }\,\!$ $= [1+j \omega (C_L+C_C) (R_o\|R_L)] \,\!$ $\sdot \ [ 1+j \omega C_i (R_A\|R_i)] \,\!$ $\ +j \omega C_C (R_A\|R_i)\,\!$ $\sdot \left( 1-A_v \frac {R_L} {R_L+R_O} \right) \,\!$ $\ +(j \omega) ^2 C_C C_L (R_A\|R_i) (R_O\|R_L) \ .$

Every quadratic has two factors, and this expression simplifies to

$$\ D_{ \omega } =(1+j \omega { \tau}_1 )(1+j \omega { \tau}_2 )$$

$$= 1 + j \omega ( {\tau}_1+{\tau}_2) ) +(j \omega )^2 \tau_1 \tau_2 \ , \$$

where $\tau_1$ and $\tau_2$ are combinations of the capacitances and resistances in the formula for D_{ω}. They correspond to the time constants of the two poles of the amplifier. One or the other time constant is the longest; suppose $\tau_1$ is the longest time constant, corresponding to the lowest pole, and suppose $\tau_1$ >> $\tau_2$. (Good step response requires $\tau_1$ >> $\tau_2$. See Selection of C_{C} below.)

At low frequencies near the lowest pole of this amplifier, ordinarily the linear term in ω is more important than the quadratic term, so the low frequency behavior of D_{ω} is:

$$\begin{align}
\ D_{ \omega } & =  1+ j \omega [(C_M+C_i) (R_A\|R_i) +(C_L+C_C) (R_o\|R_L)] \\
& =  1+j \omega ( \tau_1 + \tau_2) \approx 1 + j \omega \tau_1 \ , \ \\
\end{align}$$

where now C_{M} is redefined using the Miller approximation as

$$C_M= C_C \left( 1 - A_v \frac {R_L}{R_L+R_o} \right) \ ,$$

which is simply the previous Miller capacitance evaluated at low frequencies. On this basis $\tau_1$ is determined, provided $\tau_1$ >> $\tau_2$. Because C_{M} is large, the time constant ${\tau}_1$ is much larger than its original value of C_{i} ( R_{A} || R_{i} ).

At high frequencies the quadratic term becomes important. Assuming the above result for $\tau_1$ is valid, the second time constant, the position of the high frequency pole, is found from the quadratic term in D_{ω} as

$$\tau_2 = \frac {\tau_1 \tau_2} {\tau_1} \approx \frac {\tau_1 \tau_2} {\tau_1 + \tau_2}\ .$$

Substituting in this expression the quadratic coefficient corresponding to the product $\tau_1 \tau_2$ along with the estimate for $\tau_1$, an estimate for the position of the second pole is found:

$$\begin{align}
\tau_2 & = \frac {(C_C C_L +C_L C_i+C_i C_C)(R_A\|R_i)  (R_O\|R_L) } {(C_M+C_i) (R_A\|R_i) +(C_L+C_C) (R_o\|R_L)}  \\
& \approx  \frac {C_C C_L +C_L C_i+C_i C_C} {C_M} (R_O\|R_L)\ ,  \\
\end{align}$$

and because C_{M} is large, it seems $\tau_2$ is reduced in size from its original value C_{L} ( R_{o} || R_{L} ); that is, the higher pole has moved still higher in frequency because of C_{C}.

In short, introducing capacitor C_{C} lowered the low pole and raised the high pole, so the term pole splitting seems a good description.

=== Selection of C_{C} ===
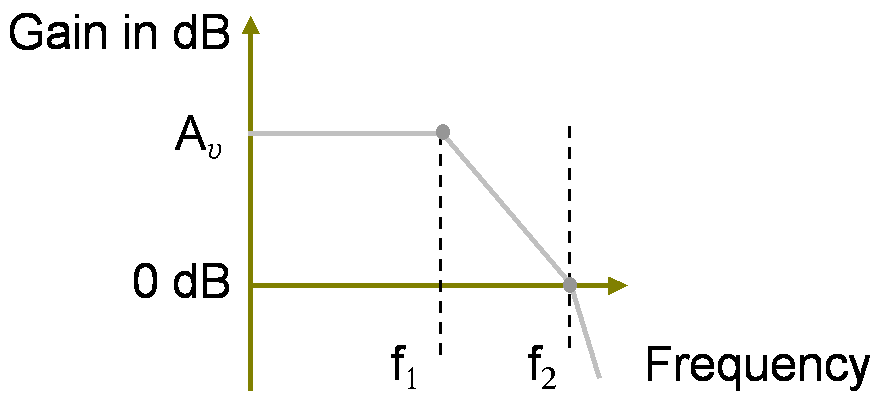
Figure 3: Idealized Bode plot for a two pole amplifier design. Gain drops from first pole at f_{1} at 20 dB / decade down to second pole at f_{2} where the slope increases to 40 dB / decade.

What value is a good choice for C_{C}? For general purpose use, traditional design (often called dominant-pole or single-pole compensation) requires the amplifier gain to drop at 20 dB/decade from the corner frequency down to 0 dB gain, or even lower. With this design the amplifier is stable and has near-optimal step response even as a unity gain voltage buffer. A more aggressive technique is two-pole compensation.

The way to position f_{2} to obtain the design is shown in Figure 3. At the lowest pole f_{1}, the Bode gain plot breaks slope to fall at 20 dB/decade. The aim is to maintain the 20 dB/decade slope all the way down to zero dB, and taking the ratio of the desired drop in gain (in dB) of 20 log_{10} A_{v} to the required change in frequency (on a log frequency scale) of ( log_{10} f_{2} − log_{10} f_{1} ) = log_{10} ( f_{2} / f_{1} ) the slope of the segment between f_{1} and f_{2} is:

Slope per decade of frequency $=20 \frac {\mathrm{log_{10}} ( A_v )} {\mathrm{log_{10}} (f_2 / f_1 ) } \ ,$

which is 20 dB/decade provided f_{2} = A_{v} f_{1} . If f_{2} is not this large, the second break in the Bode plot that occurs at the second pole interrupts the plot before the gain drops to 0 dB with consequent lower stability and degraded step response.

Figure 3 shows that to obtain the correct gain dependence on frequency, the second pole is at least a factor A_{v} higher in frequency than the first pole. The gain is reduced a bit by the voltage dividers at the input and output of the amplifier, so with corrections to A_{v} for the voltage dividers at input and output the pole-ratio condition for good step response becomes:

$$\frac {\tau_1} {\tau_2} \approx A_v  \frac {R_i} {R_i+R_A}\sdot \frac {R_L} {R_L+R_o} \ ,$$

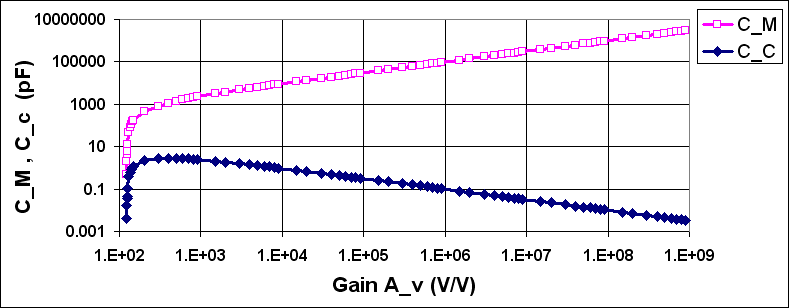
Figure 4: Miller capacitance at low frequencies C_{M} (top) and compensation capacitor C_{C} (bottom) as a function of gain using Excel. Capacitance units are pF.

Using the approximations for the time constants developed above,

$$\frac {\tau_1} {\tau_2} \approx \frac {(\tau_1 +\tau_2 ) ^2} {\tau_1 \tau_2} \approx A_v  \frac {R_i} {R_i+R_A}\sdot \frac {R_L} {R_L+R_o} \ ,$$

or

$\frac {[(C_M+C_i) (R_A\|R_i) +(C_L+C_C) (R_o\|R_L)]^2} {(C_C C_L +C_L C_i+C_i C_C)(R_A\|R_i) (R_O\|R_L) } \,\!$ ${\color{White}\sdot} = A_v \frac {R_i} {R_i+R_A}\sdot \frac {R_L} {R_L+R_o} \ ,$

which provides a quadratic equation to determine an appropriate value for C_{C}. Figure 4 shows an example using this equation. At low values of gain this example amplifier satisfies the pole-ratio condition without compensation (that is, in Figure 4 the compensation capacitor C_{C} is small at low gain), but as gain increases, a compensation capacitance rapidly becomes necessary (that is, in Figure 4 the compensation capacitor C_{C} increases rapidly with gain) because the necessary pole ratio increases with gain. For still larger gain, the necessary C_{C} drops with increasing gain because the Miller amplification of C_{C}, which increases with gain (see the Miller equation), allows a smaller value for C_{C}.

To provide more safety margin for design uncertainties, often A_{v} is increased to two or three times A_{v} on the right side of this equation. See Sansen or Huijsing and article on step response.

=== Slew rate ===
The above is a small-signal analysis. However, when large signals are used, the need to charge and discharge the compensation capacitor adversely affects the amplifier slew rate; in particular, the response to an input ramp signal is limited by the need to charge C_{C}.

== See also ==
- Frequency compensation
- Miller effect
- Common source
- Bode plot
- Step response
- CMOS amplifier
