= John Milton Miller =

American electrical engineer (1882–1962)

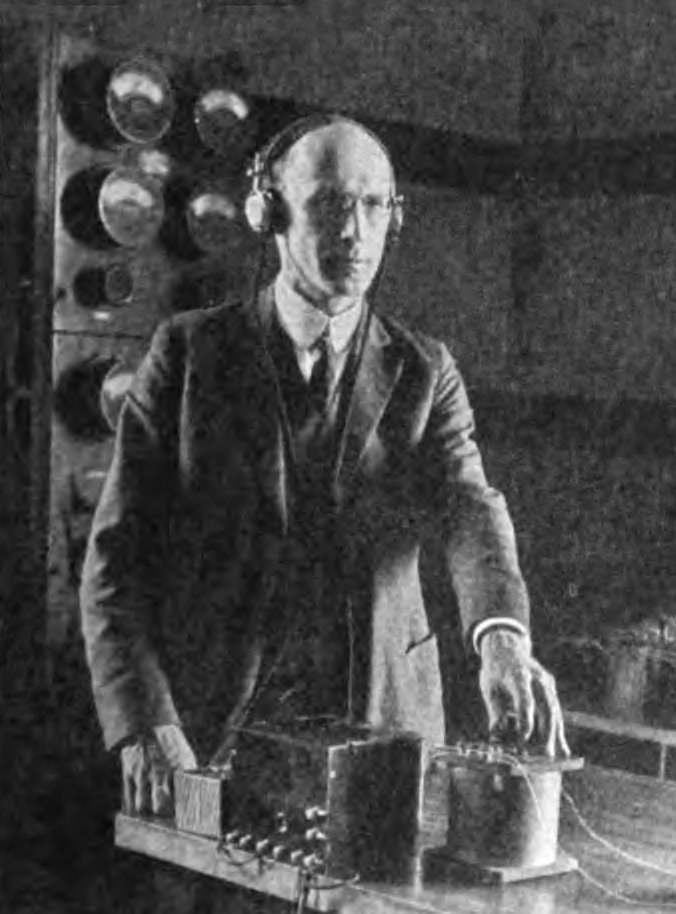
- Miller operating a radio amplifier
- Born: June 22, 1882; Hanover, Pennsylvania
- Died: May 17, 1962 (aged 79)
- Awards: IEEE Medal of Honor (1953)
- Scientific career
- Fields: Electrical engineering

John Milton Miller (June 22, 1882 – May 17, 1962) was a noted American electrical engineer, best known for discovering the Miller effect and inventing fundamental circuits for quartz crystal oscillators (Miller oscillators).

== Formative years and family ==
Miller was born in Hanover, Pennsylvania on June 22, 1882. In 1904, he graduated from Yale University. He then obtained his M.A. there in 1907, followed by his Ph.D. in Physics in 1915.

He married Frances Riley; the couple had seven children — two girls and five boys.

== Career ==
From 1907 to 1919, Miller was employed as a physicist with the National Bureau of Standards; he then worked as a radio engineer at the United States Navy's Radio Laboratory in Anacostia, District of Columbia from 1919 to 1923, and subsequently at the Naval Research Laboratory (NRL). From 1925 to 1936, he led radio receiver research at the Atwater Kent Manufacturing Company, Philadelphia. From 1936 to 1940, he was the assistant head of the research laboratory for the RCA Radiotron Company. In 1940, he returned to NRL where he became superintendent of Radio I Division (1945), associate director of research (1951), and scientific research administrator (1952).

== Honors ==
Miller was awarded the Distinguished Civilian Service Award in 1945 for "initiation of the development of a new flexible radio-frequency cable urgently needed in radio and radar equipment which solved a desperate material shortage in the United States during World War II," and the IRE Medal of Honor in 1953 for "his pioneering contributions to our basic knowledge of electron tube theory, of radio instruments and measurements, and of crystal controlled oscillators."
