= Power bandwidth =

The power bandwidth of an amplifier is sometimes taken as the frequency range (or, rarely, the upper frequency limit) for which the rated power output of an amplifier can be maintained (without excessive distortion) to at least half of the full rated power. (Some specifications may mandate 100% of the rated power; sometimes referring to the full-power bandwidth.)

It should not be confused with "half-power" bandwidth, only used in conjunction with filter frequency response curves, where it refers to -3dB points in the frequency response of a band-pass filter.

Data sheets for operational amplifiers often use the term (full-)power bandwidth to indicate the highest frequency at which the achievable peak-to-peak output voltage swing is still equal to the DC output voltage range. This is also sometimes described as the slew-rate-limited bandwidth. The full-power bandwidth $BW$ is then related to the slew rate $SR$ in volts per second and the peak-to-peak voltage swing $V_{amp}$ by

$$BW=\frac{SR}{\pi ~V_{amp}}$$

where $BW$ is expressed in hertz. In data sheets for commonly available operational amplifiers, slew rate is usually given in volts per microsecond.

== Specifying power bandwidth ==
Power bandwidth may be specified as a frequency limit or shown in the form of a graph (e.g. as maximum available voltage swing versus frequency, often with power supply voltage as a parameter).
