= Virtual ground =

Fixed potential node in an electric circuit

In electronics, a virtual ground (or virtual earth) is a node of a circuit that is maintained at a steady reference potential, without being connected directly to the reference potential. In some cases the reference potential is considered to be that of the surface of the earth, and the reference node is called "ground" or "earth" as a consequence.

The virtual ground concept aids circuit analysis in operational amplifiers and other circuits and provides useful practical circuit effects that would be difficult to achieve in other ways.

In circuit theory, a node may have any value of current or voltage but physical implementations of a virtual ground will have limitations in terms of current handling ability and a non-zero impedance which may have practical side effects.

== Construction ==
A voltage divider, using two resistors, can be used to create a virtual ground node. If two voltage sources are connected in series with two resistors, it can be shown that the midpoint becomes a virtual ground if

$$\frac{V_\text{out}}{V_\text{in}} = -\frac{R_\text{f}}{R_\text{in}}$$

Op-amp inverting amplifier. The + terminal is connected to the real ground, while the − terminal is set up to work as a virtual ground.

An active virtual ground circuit is sometimes called a rail splitter. Such a circuit uses an op-amp or some other circuit element that has gain. Since an operational amplifier has very high open-loop gain, the potential difference between its inputs tends to zero when a feedback network is implemented. This means that the output supplies the inverting input (via the feedback network) with enough voltage to reduce the potential difference between the inputs to microvolts. More precisely, it can be shown that the output voltage of the amplifier in the figure is approximately equal to $-\frac{R_f}{R_{in}} V_{in}$. Thus, as far as the amplifier is working in its linear region (output not saturated, frequencies inside the range of the opamp), the voltage at the inverting input terminal remains constant with respect to the real ground, and independent from the loads to which the output may be connected. This property is characterized a "virtual ground".

== Applications ==
Voltage is a differential quantity, which appears between two points. In order to deal only with a voltage (an electrical potential) of a single point, the second point has to be connected to a reference point (ground). Usually, the power supply terminals serve as steady grounds; when the internal points of compound power sources are accessible, they can also serve as real grounds.

If there are no accessible source internal points, external circuit points with steady voltage relative to the source terminals can serve as artificial virtual grounds. Such a point has to have steady potential, which does not vary when a load is attached.

== See also ==
- Voltage-to-current converter and current-to-voltage converter show some typical virtual ground applications
- Miller theorem applications
