= Charge amplifier =

Electronic current integrator

A charge amplifier is an electronic current integrator that produces a voltage output proportional to the integrated value of the input current, or the total charge injected.

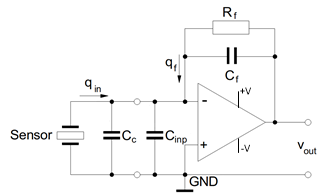
Schematic of a charge amplifier with a piezoelectric sensor

The amplifier offsets the input current using a feedback reference capacitor, and produces an output voltage inversely proportional to the value of the reference capacitor but proportional to the total input charge flowing during the specified time period. The circuit therefore acts as a charge-to-voltage converter. The gain of the circuit depends on the values of the feedback capacitor.

The charge amplifier was invented by Walter Kistler in 1950.

== Design ==
Charge amplifiers are usually constructed using an operational amplifier or other high gain semiconductor circuit with a negative feedback capacitor C_{f}.

Into the inverting node flow the input charge signal q_{in} and the feedback charge q_{f} from the output. According to Kirchhoff's circuit laws they compensate each other.

$$q_{in}=-q_f$$.

The input charge and the output voltage are proportional with inverted sign. The feedback capacitor C_{f} sets the amplification.

$$v_{out}=\frac{q_f}{C_f}=-\frac{q_{in}}{C_f}$$

The input impedance of the circuit is almost zero because of the Miller effect. Hence all the stray capacitances (the cable capacitance, the amplifier input capacitance, etc.) are virtually grounded and they have no influence on the output signal.

The feedback resistor R_{f} discharges the capacitor. Without R_{f} the DC gain would be very high so that even the tiny DC input offset current of the operational amplifier would appear highly amplified at the output. R_{f} and C_{f} set the lower frequency limit of the charge amplifier.

$$f_l=\frac{1}{2 \pi R_f C_f}$$

Due to the described DC effects and the finite isolation resistances in practical charge amplifiers the circuit is not suitable for the measurement of static charges. High quality charge amplifiers allow, however, quasistatic measurements at frequencies below 0.1 Hz. Some manufacturers also use a reset switch instead of R_{f} to manually discharge C_{f} before a measurement.

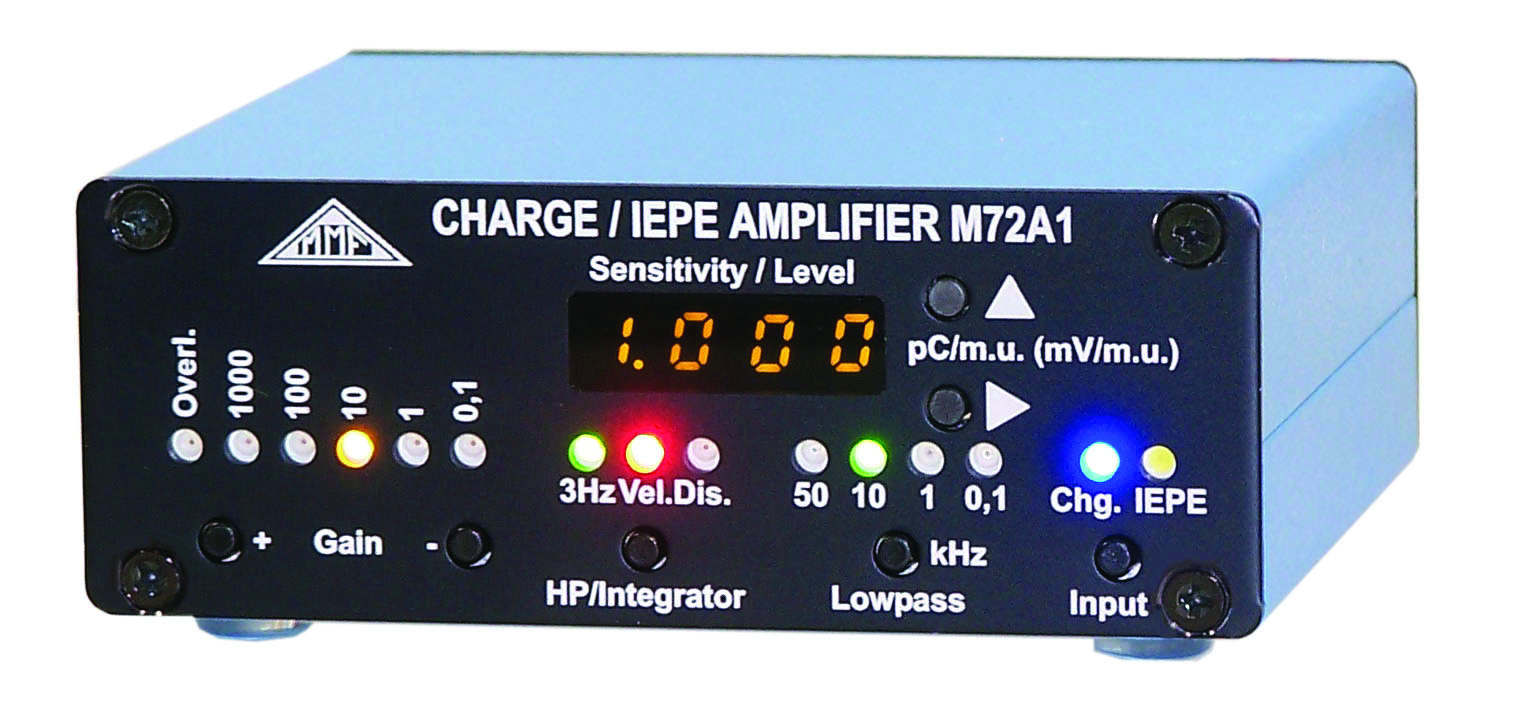
Charge amplifier for piezoelectric sensors

Practical charge amplifiers usually include additional stages like voltage amplifiers, transducer sensitivity adjustment, high and low pass filters, integrators and level monitoring circuits.

The charge signals at the input of a charge amplifier can be as low as some fC (FemtoCoulomb = 10^{−15}C). A parasitic effect of common coaxial sensor cables is a charge shift when the cable is bent. Even slight cable motion may produce considerable charge signals which cannot be distinguished from the sensor signal. Special low noise cables with a conductive coating of the inner isolation have been developed to minimize such effects.

== Applications ==
Common applications include amplification of signals from devices such as piezoelectric sensors and photodiodes, in which the charge output from the device is converted into a voltage.

Charge amplifiers are also used extensively in instruments measuring ionizing radiation, such as the proportional counter or the scintillation counter, where the energy of each pulse of detected radiation due to an ionising event must be measured. Integrating the charge pulses from the detector gives a translation of input pulse energy to a peak voltage output, which can then be measured for each pulse. Normally this then goes to discrimination circuits or a multi channel analyzer.

Further applications are in the readout circuitry of CCD imagers and flat-panel X-ray detector arrays. The amplifier is able to convert the very small charge stored within an in-pixel capacitor to a voltage level that can be easily processed. Some Guitar pickup amplifiers also use charge amplifiers.

Advantages of charge amplifiers include:

- Enables quasistatic measurements in certain situations, such as constant pressures on a piezo lasting several minutes
- Piezoelectric transducers with charge output and external charge amplifiers can be used at higher temperatures than those with internal electronics
- Gain is dependent only on the feedback capacitor, unlike voltage amplifiers, which are affected greatly by the input capacitance of the amplifier and the parallel capacitance of the cable

== See also ==
- Obtaining virtual zero impedance by applying Miller theorem
- Charge Transfer Amplifier
