= Electronic oscillation =

Electronic oscillation is a repeating cyclical variation in voltage or current in an electrical circuit, resulting in a periodic waveform. The frequency of the oscillation in hertz is the number of times the cycle repeats per second.

The recurrence may be in the form of a varying voltage or a varying current. The waveform may be sinusoidal or some other shape when its magnitude is plotted against time. Electronic oscillation may be intentionally caused, as in devices designed as oscillators, or it may be the result of unintentional positive feedback from the output of an electronic device to its input. The latter appears often in feedback amplifiers (such as operational amplifiers) that do not have sufficient gain or phase margins. In this case, the oscillation often interferes with or compromises the amplifier's intended function, and is known as parasitic oscillation.
