= Open-loop gain =

Gain in an electric amplifier

The open-loop gain of an electronic amplifier is the gain obtained when no overall feedback is used in the circuit.

The open-loop gain of many electronic amplifiers is exceedingly high (by design) – an ideal operational amplifier (op-amp) has infinite open-loop gain. Typically an op-amp may have a maximal open-loop gain of around $10^5$, or 100 dB. An op-amp with a large open-loop gain offers high precision when used as an inverting amplifier.

Normally, negative feedback is applied around an amplifier with high open-loop gain, to reduce the gain of the complete circuit to a desired value.

== Definition ==
The definition of open-loop gain (at a fixed frequency) is

$A_\text{OL} = \frac{V_\text{out}}{V^+ - V^-},$

where $V^ + -V^-$ is the input voltage difference that is being amplified. (The dependence on frequency is not displayed here.)

== Role in non-ideal gain ==
The open-loop gain is a physical attribute of an operational amplifier that is often finite in comparison to the ideal gain. While open-loop gain is the gain when there is no feedback in a circuit, an operational amplifier will often be configured to use a feedback configuration such that its gain will be controlled by the feedback circuit components.

Take the case of an inverting operational amplifier configuration. If the resistor between the single output node and the inverting input node is $R_2$ and the resistor between a source voltage and the inverting input node is $R_1$, then the calculated gain of such a circuit at the output terminal is defined, assuming infinite gain in the amplifier, is:

$$G = - \frac{R_2}{R_1}$$

However, including the finite open-loop gain $A$ reduces the gain slightly, to:

$$G = \frac{-\frac{R_2}{R_1}}{1 + (1+{\frac{R_2}{R_1}})\frac{1}{A}}$$

For example, if $\frac{R_2}{R_1} = 2$ and $A = 10^4$, then $G =$ −1.9994 instead of exactly −2.

(The second equation becomes effectively the same as the first equation as $A$ approaches infinity.)

The open-loop gain can be important for computing the actual gain of an operational amplifier network, where the assumption of infinite open-loop gain is inaccurate.

== Operational amplifiers ==
The open-loop gain of an operational amplifier falls very rapidly with increasing frequency. Along with slew rate, this is one of the reasons why operational amplifiers have limited bandwidth.

== See also ==
- Gain–bandwidth product
- Loop gain (includes both the open-loop gain and the feedback attenuation)
- Summary of negative feedback amplifier terms
