= Slew rate =

Change of voltage or current per unit of time

Slew rate effect on a square wave: red=desired output, green=actual output

In electronics and electromagnetics, slew rate is defined as the change of voltage or current, or any other electrical or electromagnetic quantity, per unit of time. Expressed in SI units, the unit of measurement is given as the change per second, but in the context of electronic circuits a slew rate is usually expressed in terms of microseconds (μs) or nanoseconds (ns).

Electronic circuits may specify minimum or maximum limits on the slew rates for their inputs or outputs, with these limits only valid under some set of given conditions (e.g. output loading). When given for the output of a circuit, such as an amplifier, the slew rate specification guarantees that the speed of the output signal transition will be at least the given minimum, or at most the given maximum. When applied to the input of a circuit, it instead indicates that the external driving circuitry needs to meet those limits in order to guarantee the correct operation of the receiving device. If these limits are violated, some error might occur and correct operation is no longer guaranteed.

For example, when the input to a digital circuit is driven too slowly, the digital input value registered by the circuit may oscillate between 0 and 1 during the signal transition. In other cases, a maximum slew rate is specified in order to limit the high frequency content present in the signal, thereby preventing such undesirable effects as ringing or radiated interference.

In amplifiers, limitations in slew rate capability can give rise to non-linear effects. For a sinusoidal waveform not to be subject to slew rate limitation, the slew rate capability (in volts per second) at all points in an amplifier must satisfy the following condition:

$$\mathrm{SR} \ge 2\pi f V_{\mathrm{pk}},$$

where f is the operating frequency, and $V_{\mathrm{pk}}$ is the peak amplitude of the waveform, i.e. half the peak-to-peak swing of a sinusoid.

In mechanics the slew rate is the change in position over time of an object which orbits around the observer, measured in radians, degrees or turns per unit of time. It has dimension $\mathsf{T}^{{-}1}.$

== Definition ==
The slew rate of an electronic circuit is defined as the rate of change of the voltage per unit time. Slew rate is usually expressed in units of V/μs.

$$\mathrm{SR} = \max\left|\frac{dv_\mathrm{out}(t)}{dt}\right|$$

where $v_\mathrm{out}(t)$ is the output produced by the amplifier as a function of time t.

== Measurement ==
The slew rate can be measured using a function generator (usually square wave) and an oscilloscope. The slew rate is the same, regardless of whether feedback is considered.

== Slew rate limiting in amplifiers ==
Simplified opamp internals. The first amplification stage multiplies the differential input voltage (V_{in}) times a transconductance (g_{m}) to produce a current (I). The next stage converts that current into a voltage (V_{2}) and provides frequency compensation by integrating that current through a miller capacitance (C). The maximum current I_{sat} that can be drawn from that first stage will limit the slew rate in this integration stage to I_{sat}/C.

There are slight differences between different amplifier designs in how the slewing phenomenon occurs. The figure gives a simplified schematic of the first two stages of an operational amplifier (opamp) to ease understanding.

The input stage is usually a differential amplifier with a transconductance characteristic. This means the input stage takes a differential input voltage and produces an output current into the second stage. The transconductance is typically very high — this is where the large open loop gain of the amplifier is generated. This also means that a fairly small input voltage can cause the input stage to saturate. In saturation, the stage produces a nearly constant output current.

The second stage is where frequency compensation is accomplished. The low pass characteristic of this stage approximates an integrator. A constant current input will therefore produce a linearly increasing output. If the second stage has an effective input capacitance $C$, then its slew rate is:

$$\mathrm{SR} = \frac{I_\mathrm{sat}}{C}$$

where $I_\mathrm{sat}$ is the output current of the first stage in saturation. The slew rate might be multiplied by subsequent voltage gain.

Slew rate helps us identify the maximum input frequency and amplitude applicable to the amplifier such that the output is not significantly distorted. Thus it becomes imperative to check the datasheet for the device's slew rate before using it for high-frequency applications.

Slew rate can be deliberately limited using two opamps, a capacitor, and two resistors.

== Musical applications ==
In electronic musical instruments, slew circuitry or software-generated slew functions are used deliberately to provide a portamento (also called glide or lag) feature, where an initial digital value or analog control voltage is slowly transitioned to a new value over a period of time (see interpolation).

== See also ==
- Power bandwidth
