= Multistage amplifier =

Amplifier consisting of two or more simple amplifiers connected in series

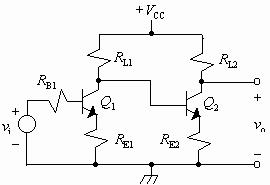
Simplified diagram of a 2-stage cascaded amplifier

A multistage amplifier is an electronic amplifier consisting of two or more single-stage amplifiers connected together. In this context, a single stage is an amplifier containing only a single transistor (sometimes a pair of transistors) or other active device. The most common reason for using multiple stages is to increase the gain of the amplifier in applications where the input signal is very small, for instance in radio receivers. In these applications a single stage has insufficient gain by itself. In some designs it is possible to obtain more desirable values of other parameters such as input resistance and output resistance.

== Connection schemes ==
The simplest, and most common, connection scheme is a cascade connection of identical, or similar, stages forming a cascade amplifier. In a cascade connection, the output port of one stage is connected to the input port of the next. Typically, the individual stages are bipolar junction transistors (BJTs) in a common emitter configuration or field-effect transistors (FETs) in a common source configuration. There are some applications where the common base configuration is preferred. Common base has high voltage gain but no current gain. It is used in UHF television and radio receivers because its low input resistance is easier to match to antennas than common emitter. In amplifiers that have a differential input and are required to output a differential signal the stages must be differential amplifiers such as long-tailed pairs. These stages contain two transistors to deal with the differential signalling.

More complex schemes can be used with different stages having different configurations to create an amplifier whose characteristics exceed those of a single-stage for several different parameters, such as gain, input resistance and output resistance. The final stage can be a common collector configuration to act as a buffer amplifier. Common collector stages have no voltage gain but high current gain and low output resistance. The load can thus draw high current without affecting the amplifier performance. A cascode connection (common emitter stage followed by common base stage) is sometimes found. Audio power amplifiers will typically have a push–pull output as the final stage.

A Darlington pair of transistors is another way of obtaining a high current gain. In this connection the emitter of the first transistor feeds the base of the second with both collectors commoned. Unlike the common collector stage, a Darlington pair can have voltage gain as well as current gain. A Darlington pair is usually treated as being a single stage rather than two separate stages. It is connected in the same way as a single transistor would be, and is often packaged as a single device.

Overall negative feedback may be applied to the amplifier. This reduces voltage gain but has several desirable effects; input resistance is increased, output resistance is decreased, and bandwidth is increased.

== Overall gain ==
The complication in calculating the gain of cascaded stages is the non-ideal coupling between stages due to loading. Two cascaded common emitter stages are shown. Because the input resistance of the second stage forms a voltage divider with the output resistance of the first stage, the total gain is not the product of the individual (separated) stages.

The overall gain of a multistage amplifier is the product of the gains of the individual stages (ignoring potential loading effects):

Gain (A) = A_{1}* A_{2}*A_{3} *A_{4} *... *A_{n}.

Alternately, if the gain of each amplifier stage is expressed in decibels (dB), the total gain is the sum of the gains of the individual stages:

Gain in dB (A) = A_{1} + A_{2} + A_{3} + A_{4} + ... A_{n}

== Inter-stage coupling ==
There are a number of choices for the method of coupling the amplifier stages together. In the direct-coupled amplifier, as the name suggests, the stages are connected by simple conductors between the output of one stage and the input of the next This is necessary where the amplifier is required to work at DC, such as in instrumentation amplifiers, but has several drawbacks. The direct connection causes the bias circuits of adjacent stages to interact with each other. This complicates the design and leads to compromises on other amplifier parameters. DC amplifiers are also subject to drift requiring careful adjustment and high stability components.

Where DC amplification is not required, a common choice is RC coupling. In this scheme a capacitor is connected in series between stage outputs and inputs. Since the capacitor will not pass DC the stage biases cannot interact. The output of the amplifier will not drift from zero when there is no input. The capacitance (C) of the capacitor and the input and output resistances of the stages form an RC circuit. This acts as a crude high-pass filter. The capacitor value must be made large enough that this filter passes the lowest frequency of interest. For audio amplifiers, this value can be relatively large, but at radio frequencies it is a small component of insignificant cost compared to the overall amplifier.

Transformer coupling is an alternative AC coupling. Like RC coupling, it isolates DC between stages. However, transformers are bulkier and much more expensive than capacitors so is used less often. Transformer coupling comes into its own in tuned amplifiers. The inductance of the transformer windings serves as the inductor of an LC tuned circuit. If both sides of the transformer are tuned it is called a double-tuned amplifier. Staggered tuning is where each stage is tuned to a different frequency in order to improve bandwidth at the expense of gain.

Optical coupling is achieved using opto-isolators between stages. These have the advantage of providing complete electrical isolation between stages so provides DC isolation and avoids interaction between stages. Optical isolation is sometimes done for electrical safety reasons. It can also be used to provide a balanced to unbalanced transition.
