= PGAS =

PGAS may refer to:

- Partitioned global address space, a parallel programming model in computer science
- Provisional Government of Autonomous Siberia, an ephemeral government in Siberia in 1918
- Pertamina Gas Negara, Indonesia Stock Exchange symbol PGAS
- Pegatron Corporation, Luxembourg Stock Exchange symbol PGAS
- Polyglandular autoimmune syndrome, or autoimmune polyendocrine syndrome

== See also ==
- PGSA (disambiguation)
- PGA (disambiguation)
