= PGA =

PGA is an acronym or initialism that may stand for:

== Aviation ==
- IATA code for Page Municipal Airport, Coconino County, Arizona
- ICAO designator for Portugália, regional airline based in Lisbon, Portugal
- Abbreviation for Prince George Airport, British Columbia, Canada

== Organizations ==
- Parliamentarians for Global Action, an international parliamentary group that engage in a range of action-oriented initiatives.
- Peoples' Global Action, a worldwide co-ordination of radical social movements
- Producers Guild of America, an organization representing television producers, film producers and new media producers in the United States
- The abbreviation of the Malay name for General Operations Force of Malaysia

=== Golf ===
==== Organizations and tours ====
- Professional Golfers' Association (Great Britain and Ireland)
- Professional Golfers' Association of America
- PGA Tour, United States–based organization (independent of the PGA of America) that operates men's professional golf tours, and the name of the elite tour it runs
- PGA European Tour, Europe-based organization (independent of the PGA of Great Britain and Ireland) that operates men's professional golf tours
- PGA Tour of Australasia, formerly the PGA Tour of Australia

==== Tournaments ====
- PGA Championship, one of the four men's major golf championships, organized by the PGA of America
- Women's PGA Championship
- Senior PGA Championship
- BMW PGA Championship, a professional golf tournament on the European Tour, founded by the PGA of Great Britain and Ireland
- PGA Seniors Championship
- Australian PGA Championship
- New Zealand PGA Championship
- South African PGA Championship
- Indonesia PGA Championship

== Science ==
=== Chemistry ===
- 3-Phosphoglyceric acid (or glycerate 3-phosphate), a chemical substance that is a metabolic intermediate in both glycolysis and the Calvin cycle
- Polyglutamic acid, a polymer of the glutamic acid (one of proteinogenic amino acids)
- Polyglycolic acid, another name for polyglycolide
- Propylene glycol alginate (E405), an emulsifier, stabilizer, and thickener used in food products
- Prostaglandin of the A type

=== Geology / Seismology ===
- Peak ground acceleration, measure of ground acceleration during an earthquake

=== Language ===
- pga, ISO 639-3 language code for Juba Arabic (also known as Sudanese Creole Arabic) language

=== Mathematics ===
- Principal geodesic analysis, a generalization of principal component analysis
- Projective Geometric Algebra or Plane-based Geometric Algebra

=== Medicine ===
- Pentagestrone acetate, a progestin
- Polyglandular autoimmune syndromes, another name for autoimmune polyendocrine syndromes

== Technology ==
=== Computing ===
- Perl Golf Apocalypse, a Perl coding competition
- Program Global Area, a memory region for the server processes in Oracle
- Professional Graphics Adapter or Professional Graphics Array, other names for Professional Graphics Controller, an IBM XT graphics card intended for the CAD market

=== Electronics ===
- Pin grid array, a type of packaging for integrated circuits
- Programmable-gain amplifier, an amplifier whose gain can be changed during its operation
- Programmable gate array, a semiconductor device containing programmable logic components and programmable interconnects (vast majority of today's PGAs are field-programmable gate arrays, or FPGAs)

== Other ==
- Panasonic Gobel Awards, annual Indonesian TV awards, from 1997 until 2019
- Paul Gardner Allen (1953–2018), American business magnate, co-founder of Microsoft
- Petro Gazz Angels, a Philippine volleyball team
- Pure grain alcohol, another name for neutral grain spirit
