= Intermediate-frequency amplifier =

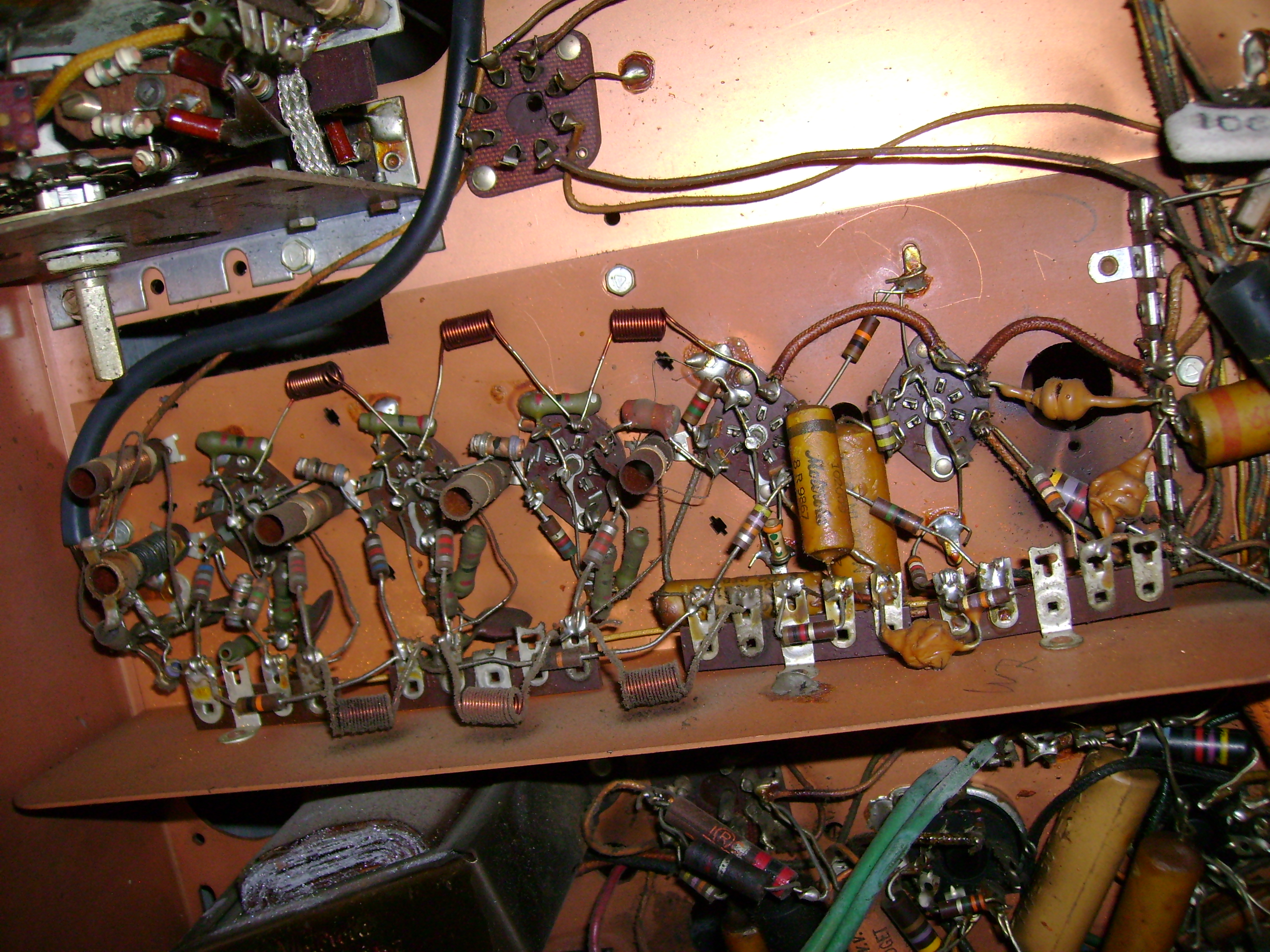
The IF stage from a Motorola 19K1 television set circa 1949.

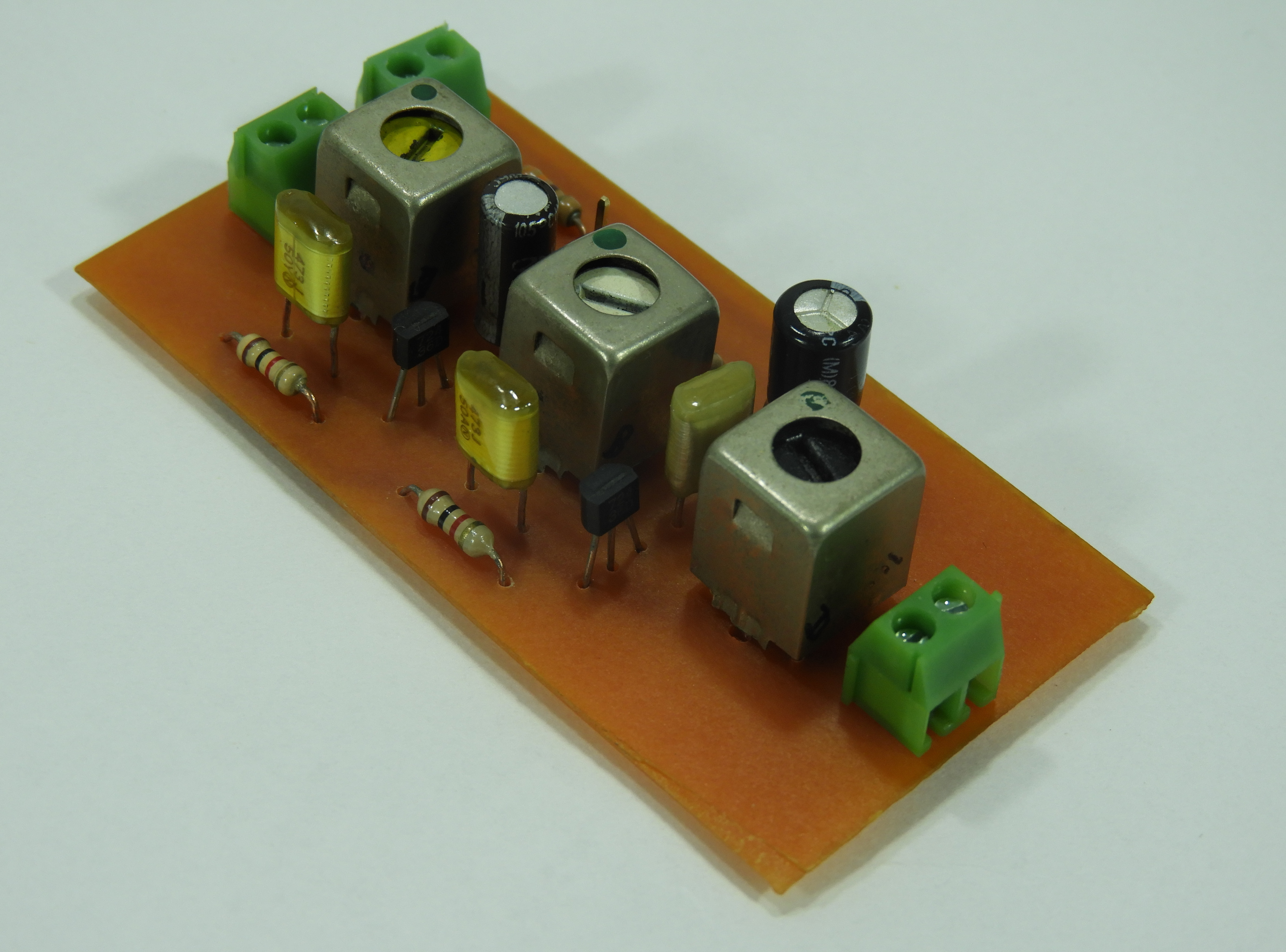
Discrete transistor 455 kHz IF amplifier.

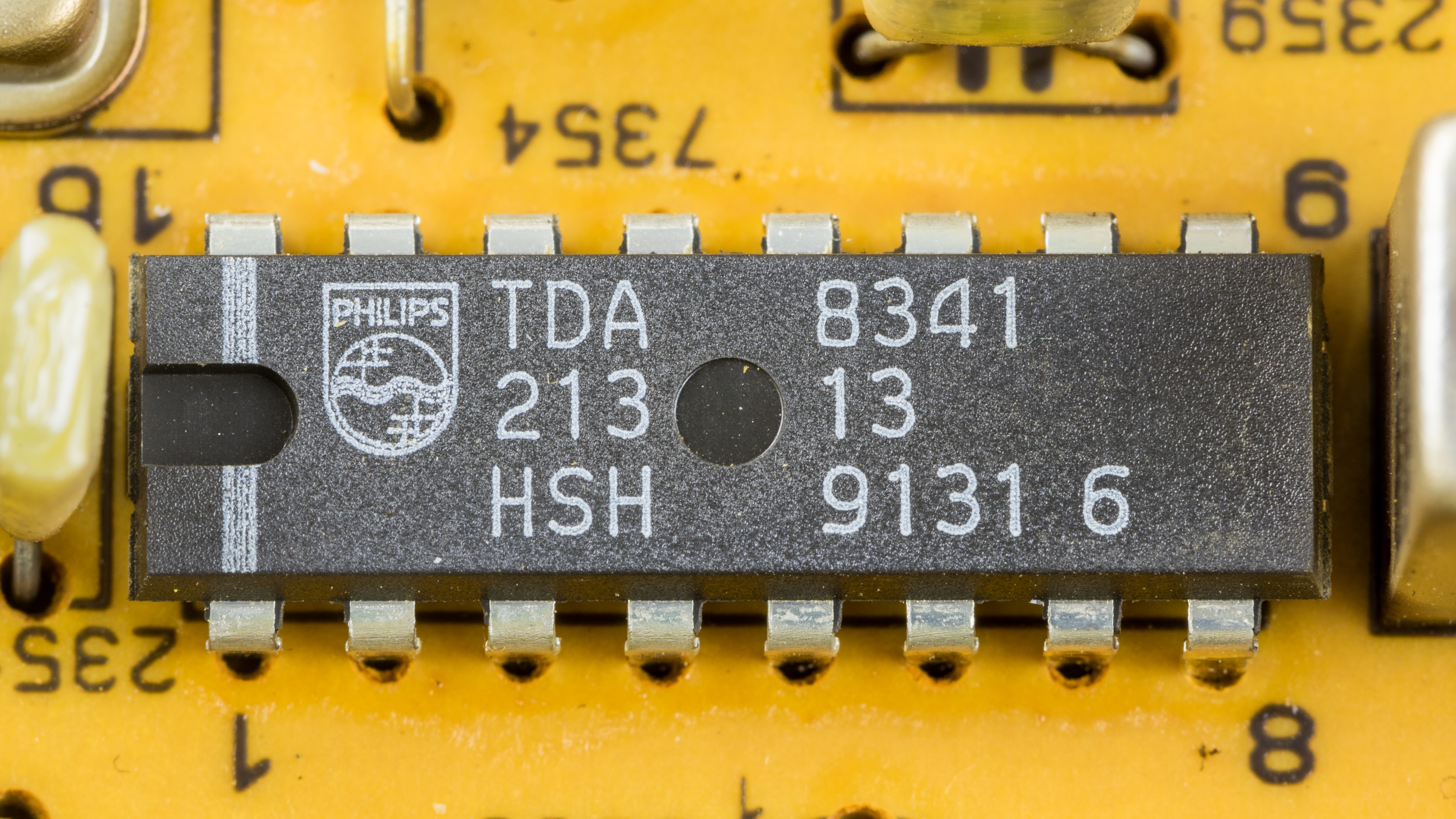
More modern IF amplifier and demodulator in integrated circuit form

Intermediate-frequency (IF) amplifiers are amplifier stages used to raise signal levels in radio and television receivers, at frequencies intermediate to the higher radio-frequency (RF) signal from the antenna and the lower (baseband) audio or video frequency that the receiver is recovering.

== Uses ==
IF amplifiers in heterodyne receivers apply gain in a frequency band between the input radio frequency and output audio frequency or video frequency, often following one stage of RF amplifier. This allows most of the gain in the form of a fixed-frequency amplifier, simplifying tuning. Compare to its predecessor, the tuned RF receiver. IF amplifiers might use double-tuned amplifiers or staggered tuning to generate the appropriate frequency response needed. Some use more than one IF frequency.

== Commonly used circuits ==
- Mutual inductance coupling: contains two windings that are joined by mutual inductance.
- Shunt capacitance coupling: These circuits have a wide pass band.
- composite IF transformers: receivers used for A-M and F-M receivers.
