= PAE =

PAE may refer to:

== Science and technology ==
- Predicted Aligned Error, AlphaFold output file format for errors of protein structure prediction
- Physical Address Extension, an x86 computer processor feature for accessing more than 4 gigabytes of RAM
- Power added efficiency, a percentage that rates the efficiency of a power amplifier
- Post Antibiotic Effect, the period of time following removal of an antibiotic drug during which there is no growth of the target organism
- Port Access Entity, in the IEEE 802.1X networking environment
- Primary amoebic encephalitis, another name for primary amoebic meningoencephalitis
- Prostatic artery embolization, a treatment for benign prostatic hyperplasia

== Places ==
- City of Port Adelaide Enfield, South Australia
- Paine Field (IATA airport code), an airport in Everett, Washington

== Other uses ==
- Pacific Architects and Engineers, a United States defense contractor
- Post-autistic economics, a criticism of neoclassical economics
- Provisional Admission Exercise, an interim exercise/period in Singapore education
- Patent assertion entity, a patent troll company

== See also ==
- Large Physical Address Extension (LPAE), in the ARM architecture
