= Line driver =

Type of electrical circuit

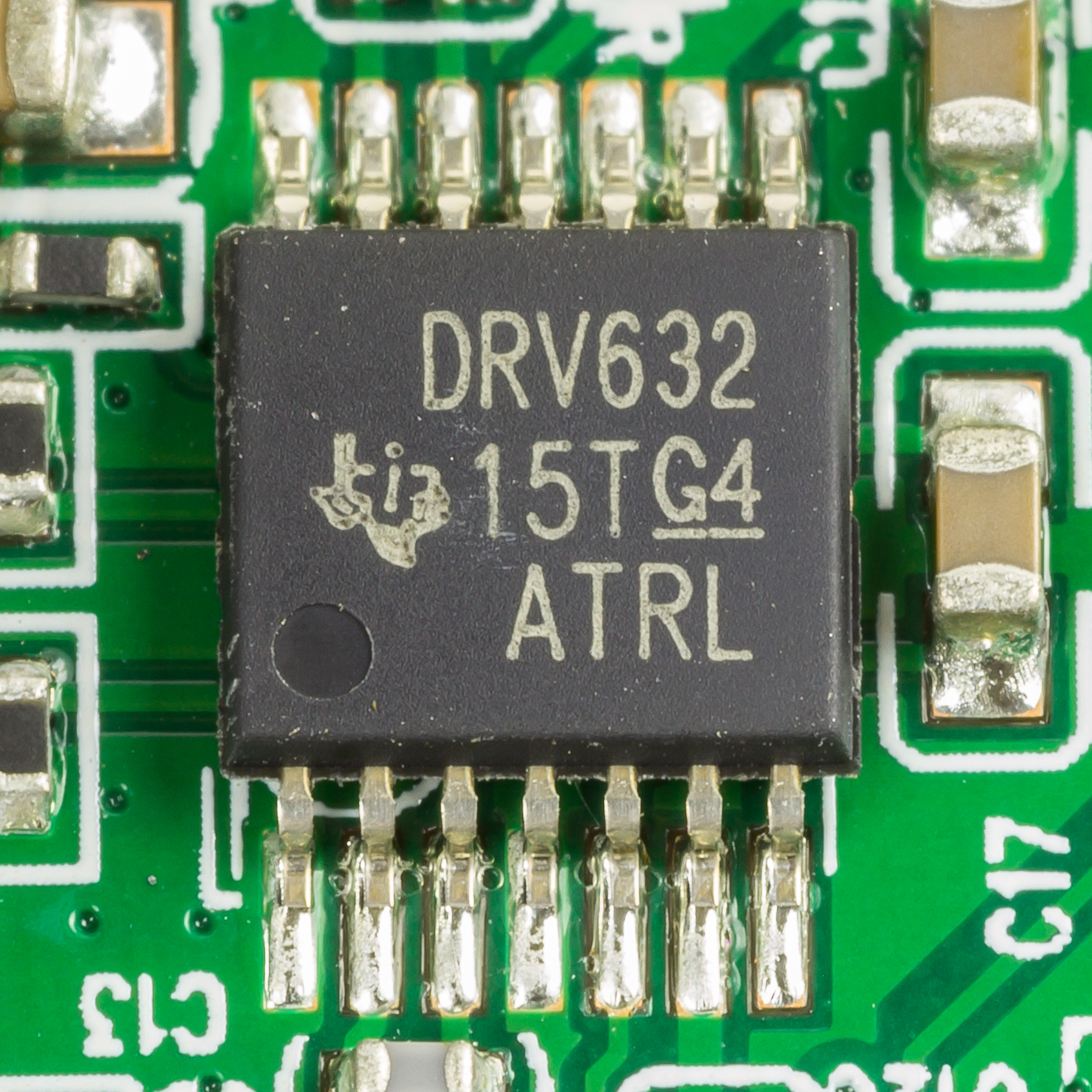
Texas Instruments DRV632 - DirectPath, 2-VRMS Audio Line Driver with Adjustable Gain

A line driver is an electronic amplifier circuit designed for driving a load such as a transmission line. The amplifier's output impedance may be matched to the characteristic impedance of the transmission line.

Line drivers are commonly used within digital systems, e.g. to communicate digital signals across circuit-board traces and cables.

In analog audio, a line driver is typically used to drive line-level analog signal outputs, for example to connect a CD player to an amplified speaker system.
