= Tuned amplifier =

A tuned amplifier is an electronic amplifier which includes bandpass filtering components within the amplifier circuitry. They are widely used in a variety of wireless applications.

A typical multi-stage tuned amplifier

== Schemes ==
There are several tuning schemes in use,

- Staggered tuning where each amplifier stage is tuned to a slightly different frequency.
- Synchronous tuning (explained in more detail in the staggered tuning article) where each amplifier stage is tuned identically. This scheme maximises the amplifier gain but has narrower bandwidth than staggered tuning.
- Double-tuned amplifier. This scheme is used on amplifier stages that are transformer-coupled rather than capacitor coupled. Both the primary and secondary coils of the transformer are tuned. This has the effect of widening the bandwidth. Other tuning schemes are sometimes called single-tuned to distinguish them.

== Variable tuning ==
The RF amplifier stages of radio receivers require variable tuning to select the station, usually achieved by using variable capacitors in the resonant circuits. The tuning of all stages of the RF amplifier have to be kept in step along with the frequency of the local oscillator. This may be done by mechanically linking the capacitors, or electronically using varicap diodes as capacitors. Since linked tuning becomes more difficult as the number of stages increase, the number of RF stages is kept to a minimum with most of the tuning happening in the IF stages. The IF amplifier operates at a fixed frequency making tuning much easier.
