= Intermediate power amplifier =

An Intermediate power amplifier (IPA) is one stage of the amplification process in a radio transmitter which usually occurs prior to the final high power amplification. The IPA provides lower power RF energy necessary to drive the final. In very high power transmitters, such as 10 kilowatts and above, multiple IPAs are combined to provide enough drive for the final.

An exciter, an even lower power transmitter, provides a similar service to the IPA by driving it; although an exciter usually encompasses other important functions, such as choosing the frequency of the RF.
