= PGSA (disambiguation) =

PGSA may refer to:

- Pennsylvania Governor's School for the Arts
- Persian Gulf Strait Authority

== See also ==
- PGAS (disambiguation)
