= Charge-transfer amplifier =

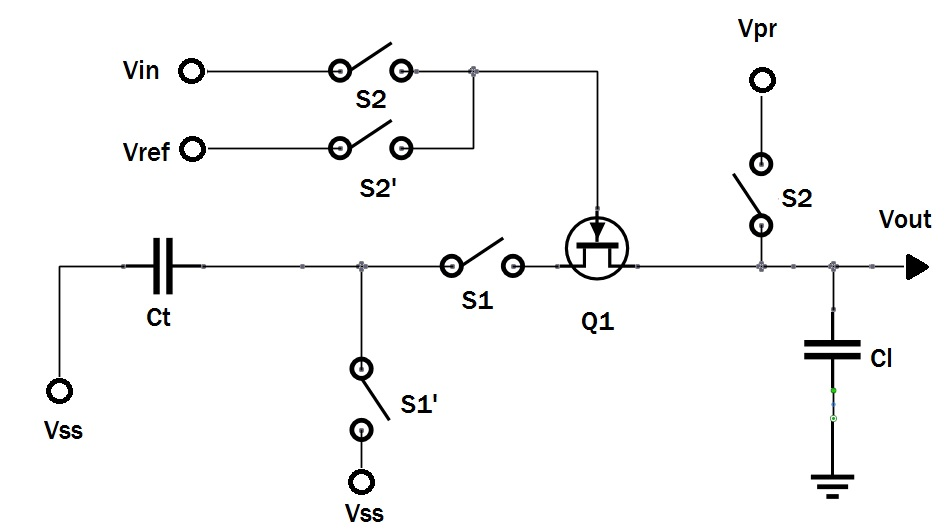
Charge-transfer amplifier schematic

The charge-transfer amplifier (CTA) is an electronic amplifier circuit. Also known as transconveyance amplifiers, CTAs amplify electronic signals by dynamically conveying charge between capacitive nodes in proportion to the size of a differential input voltage. By appropriately selecting the relative node capacitances, voltage amplification occurs by the charge-voltage relationship of capacitors. CTAs are clocked, or sampling, amplifiers. They consume zero static power and can be designed to consume (theoretically) arbitrarily low dynamic power, proportional to the size of input signals being sampled. CMOS technology is most commonly used for implementation.

CTAs were introduced in memory circuits in the 1970s and are also used in dynamic voltage comparator circuits. More recently, CTAs have been applied in multi-bit analog-to-digital converters (ADCs).

== See also ==
- Comparator
- Mixed-signal integrated circuit
- Charge amplifier
