= Programmable-gain amplifier =

Type of electronic amplifier

LTC6910 digitally controlled programmable gain amplifier

A programmable-gain amplifier (PGA) is an electronic amplifier (typically based on an operational amplifier) whose gain can be controlled by external digital or analog signals.

The gain can be set from less than 1 V/V to over 100 V/V. Examples for the external digital signals can be SPI, I²C while the latest PGAs can also be programmed for offset voltage trimming, as well as active output filters. Popular applications for these products are motor control, signal and sensor conditioning.
