= Transition band =

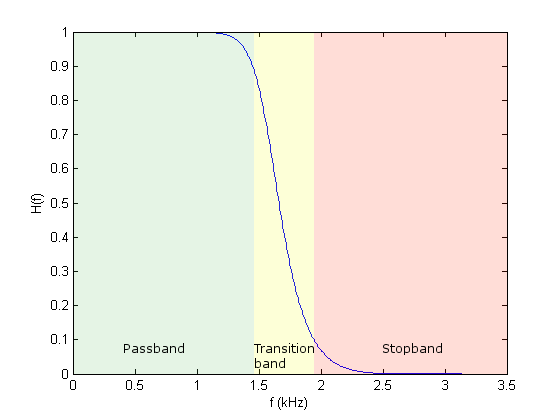
A plot of the frequency response of a Butterworth Lowpass filter, with a cutoff frequency of 2kHz.

The transition band, also called the skirt, is a range of frequencies that allows a transition between a passband and a stopband of a signal processing filter. The transition band is defined by a passband and a stopband cutoff frequency or corner frequency.

This is the area between where a filter "turns the corner" and where it "hits the bottom".

An example of this can be taken from a low-pass filter, commonly used in audio systems to allow the bass signal to pass through to a subwoofer, and cut out all unwanted frequencies above a defined point. If the cutoff point for such a filter is defined as 200 Hz, then in a perfect system, all frequencies above 200 Hz will be stopped and all frequencies below 200 Hz will be allowed to pass through.

The transition band can be implemented to allow for a smooth fall off to avoid introducing audible peaks in amplitude. If the transition band of the example 200 Hz filter is 20 Hz, then the signal should start attenuating at 180 Hz, and finally blocked at 200 Hz. The curve that the transition band follows depends on the engineering of the filter, including component reaction time and the choice of values for the components that comprise the filter according to mathematical formula.

The transition band is usually apparent in any filter system, even if it is unwanted. This can be of general importance when calculating the values required for filters used in the control of signal transmission systems, to ensure that the entire bandwidth of the desired signal is allowed to pass.

The transition bandwidth of a filter largely depends on the order of the filter. For a higher order filter, the transition bandwidth is narrower than for a lower order filter. This is due to the fact that roll-off is higher for a filter of higher order.

For anti-alias filters in A/D converter systems, the transition bandwidth sets the time-domain smearing of the recovered signal.

== See also ==
- Passband
- Stopband
