= Power-added efficiency =

Metric for rating the efficiency of a power amplifier

Power-added efficiency (PAE) is a figure of merit for the efficiency of a radio-frequency power amplifier that takes into account the RF power needed to drive the amplifier's input. It is defined as

$\text{PAE} = \frac{P_{\text{RF, out}} - P_{\text{RF, in}}}{P_{\text{DC}}}$

where $P_{\text{RF, out}}$ is the RF output power, $P_{\text{RF, in}}$ is the RF input (drive) power, and $P_{\text{DC}}$ is the DC power drawn by the amplifier from its supply. It is usually expressed as a percentage.

It is related to, but differs from, the drain efficiency $\eta = {P_{\text{RF, out}}} / {P_{\text{DC}}}$. With the gain of the amplifier $G = \frac{P_{\text{RF, out}}}{P_{\text{RF, in}}}$, the two are related by

$\text{PAE} = \eta \left(1 - \frac{1}{G}\right)$

PAE will be very similar to efficiency when the gain of the RF power amplifier is sufficiently high such that a low RF input power causes the RF power amplifier output to reach a certain level. But if the RF power amplifier gain is relatively low then the amount of RF input power that is needed to drive the RF power amplifier output to the certain level should be considered in a metric that measures the efficiency of the said power amplifier.
