= Commutation cell =

Basic structure in power electronics

The commutation cell is the basic structure in power electronics. It is composed of two electronic switches (today, a high-power semiconductor, not a mechanical switch). It was traditionally referred to as a chopper, but since switching power supplies became a major form of power conversion, this new term has become more popular.

The purpose of the commutation cell is to "chop" DC power into square wave alternating current. This is done so that an inductor and a capacitor can be used in an LC circuit to change the voltage. This is, in theory, a lossless process; in practice, efficiencies above 80-90% are routinely achieved. The output is usually run through a filter to produce clean DC power. By controlling the on and off times (the duty cycle) of the switch in the commutation cell, the output voltage can be regulated.

This basic principle is the core of most modern power supplies, from tiny DC-DC converters in portable devices to massive switching stations for high voltage DC power transmission.

== Connection of two power elements ==
Fig. 1: The different configurations that are impossible: short circuit of a voltage source, current source in an open circuit, two voltage sources in parallel, two current sources in series. Any of these circuits will result in failure or generation of large amounts of heat!

Fig. 2: As with the voltage and current sources, direct energy transfer from a capacitor to another or from an inductor to another should be avoided, as it results in important losses.

A Commutation cell connects two power elements, often referred to as sources, although they can either produce or absorb power.

Some requirements to connect power sources exist. The impossible configurations are listed in figure 1. They are basically:

- a voltage source cannot be shorted, as the short circuit would impose a zero voltage which would contradict the voltage generated by the source;
- in an identical way, a current source cannot be placed in an open circuit;
- two (or more) voltage sources cannot be connected in parallel, as each of them would try to impose the voltage on the circuit;
- two (or more) current sources cannot be connected in series, as each of them would try to impose the current in the loop.

This applies to classical sources (battery, generator) and capacitors and inductors: At a small time scale, a capacitor is identical to a voltage source and an inductor to a current source. Connecting two capacitors with different voltage levels in parallel corresponds to connecting two voltage sources, one of the forbidden connections in figure 1.

The figure 2 illustrates the poor efficiency of such a connection. One capacitor is charged to a voltage V, and is connected to a capacitor with the same capacity, but discharged.

Before the connection, the energy in the circuit is $E=\frac{1}{2}C\cdot V^2$, and the quantity of charges Q is equal to $C\cdot U$, where U is the potential energy.

After the connection has been made, the quantity of charges is constant, and the total capacitance is $2C$. Therefore, the voltage across the capacitances is $\frac{Q}{2C}=\frac{V}{2}$. The energy in the circuit is then $\frac{1}{2}(2C)\left(\frac{V}{2}\right)^2=\frac{E}{2}$. Therefore, half of the energy has been dissipated during the connection.

The same applies with the connections in series of two inductances. The magnetic flux ($\Phi=L\cdot I$) remains constant before and after the commutation. As the total inductance after the commutation is 2L, the current becomes $\frac{I}{2}$ (see figure 2). The energy before the commutation is $\frac{1}{2}L\cdot I^2$. After, it is $\frac{1}{2}L\cdot \left(\frac{I}{2}\right)^2$. Here again, half of the energy is dissipated during the commutation.

As a result, it can be seen that a commutation cell can only connect a voltage source to a current source (and vice versa). However, using inductors and capacitors, it is possible to transform the behaviour of a source: for example, two voltage sources can be connected through a converter if it uses an inductor to transfer energy.

== The structure of a commutation cell ==
Fig. 3: A commutation cell connects two sources of different nature (current and voltage sources). It theoretically uses two switches, but as they both must be commanded with a perfect synchronization, one of the switches is replaced by a diode in practical applications. This makes the commutation cell unidirectional. A bidirectional commutation cell can be obtained by paralleling two unidirectional ones.

As mentioned above, a commutation cell must be placed between a voltage and current sources. Depending on the state of the cell, both sources are either connected, or isolated. When isolated, the current source must be shorted, as it is impossible for a current to be created in an open circuit. The basic schematic of a commutation cell is therefore given in figure 3 (top). It uses two switches with opposite states: In the configuration depicted in figure 3, both sources are isolated, and the current source is shorted. Both sources are connected when the top switch is on (and the bottom switch is off).

It is impossible to have a perfect synchronization between the switches. At one point during the commutation, they would be either on (thus shorting the voltage source) or off (thus leaving the current source in an open circuit). This is why one of the switches has to be replaced by a diode. A diode is a natural commutation device, i.e., its state is controlled by the circuit itself. It will turn on or off at the exact moment it has to. The consequence of using a diode in a commutation cell is that it makes it unidirectional (see figure 3). A bidirectional cell can be built, but it is equivalent to two unidirectional cells connected in parallel.

== The commutation cell in converters ==
Fig. 4: The commutation cell is present in every switching power supply

The commutation cell can be found in any power electronic converter. Some examples are given in figure 4. As can be seen, a "current source" (actually a loop that contains an inductance) is always connected between the middle point and one of the external connections of the commutation cell, while a voltage source (or a capacitor, or a connection in series of voltage source and capacitor) is always connected to the two external connections.

== See also ==
- Power electronics
- DC-to-DC converter
- Switched-mode power supply
- Buck converter
- Boost converter
- Buck–boost converter
- Ćuk converter
