= Split-pi topology =

Electrical circuit to change input voltage

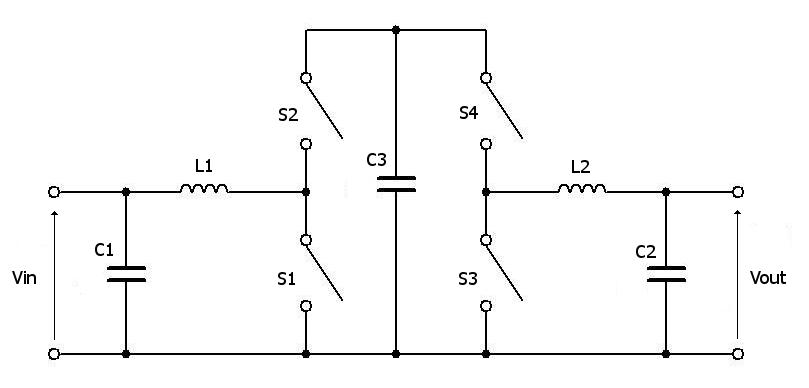
Schematic of split-pi converter topology

In electronics, a split-pi topology is a pattern of component interconnections used in a kind of power converter that can theoretically produce an arbitrary output voltage, either higher or lower than the input voltage. In practice the upper voltage output is limited to the voltage rating of components used. It is essentially a boost (step-up) converter followed by a buck (step-down) converter. The topology and use of MOSFETs make it inherently bi-directional which lends itself to applications requiring regenerative braking.

The split-pi converter is a type of DC-to-DC converter that has an output voltage magnitude either greater than or less than the input voltage magnitude. It is a switched-mode power supply with a similar circuit configuration to a boost converter followed by a buck converter. Split-pi gets its name from the pi circuit due to the use of two pi filters in series and split with the switching MOSFET bridges.

Other DC–DC converter topologies that can produce output voltage magnitude either greater than or less than the input voltage magnitude include the boost-buck converter topologies (the split-pi, the Ćuk converter, the SEPIC, etc.) and the buck–boost converter topologies.

== Principle of operation ==
In typical operation where a source voltage is located at the left-hand side input terminals, the left-hand bridge operates as a boost converter and the right-hand bridge operates as a buck converter. In regenerative mode, the reverse is true with the left-hand bridge operating as a buck converter and the right as the boost converter.

Only one bridge switches at any time to provide voltage conversion, with the unswitched bridge's top switch always switched on. A straight through 1:1 voltage output is achieved with the top switch of each bridge switch on and the bottom switches off. The output voltage is adjustable based on the duty cycle of the switching MOSFET bridge.

== Applications ==
- Electric drivetrain
- Motor control
- Battery balancing
- Regenerative braking
