= Single-ended primary-inductor converter =

Electrical device

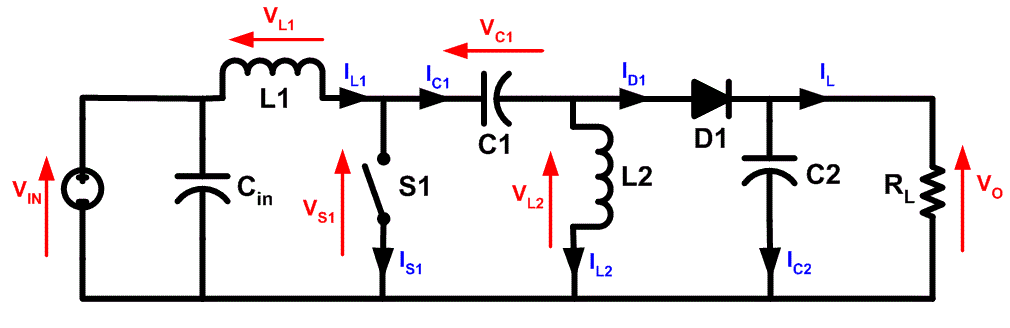
Figure 1: Schematic of SEPIC

The single-ended primary-inductor converter (SEPIC) is a type of DC-to-DC converter that allows the voltage at its output to be greater than, less than, or equal to the input voltage. The output of a SEPIC is controlled by the duty cycle of the electronic switch (S1).

A SEPIC is essentially a boost converter followed by an inverted buck–boost converter. While similar to a traditional buck–boost converter, it has a few advantages. It has a non-inverted output (the output has the same polarity as the input). Its use of a series capacitor to couple energy from the input to the output allows the circuit to respond more gracefully to a short-circuit output. And it is capable of true shutdown: when the switch S1 is open, the output (V_{O}) drops to 0 V, following a fairly hefty transient dump of charge.

SEPICs are useful in applications in which a battery voltage can be above and below that of the regulator's intended output. For example, a single lithium-ion battery typically discharges from 4.2 volts to 3 volts; if other components require 3.3 volts, then a SEPIC would be effective.

== Circuit operation ==
The schematic diagram for a basic SEPIC is shown in Figure 1. As with other switched-mode power supplies (specifically DC-to-DC converters), a SEPIC exchanges energy between capacitors and inductors in order to convert from one voltage to another. The amount of energy exchanged is controlled by switch S1, which is typically a transistor such as a MOSFET. MOSFETs offer much higher input impedance and lower voltage drop than BJTs and do not require biasing resistors, as MOSFET switching is controlled by differences in voltage, rather than current as with BJTs.

=== Continuous mode ===
A SEPIC is said to be in continuous-conduction mode ("continuous mode") if the currents through inductors L1 and L2 never fall to zero during an operating cycle. During a SEPIC's steady-state operation, the average voltage across capacitor C1 (V_{C1}) is equal to the input voltage (V_{in}). Because capacitor C1 blocks direct current (DC), the average current through it (I_{C1}) is zero, making inductor L2 the only source of DC load current. Therefore, the average current through inductor L2 (I_{L2}) is the same as the average load current and hence independent of the input voltage.

Looking at average voltages, the following can be written:

$V_{IN} = V_{L1} + V_{C1} + V_{L2}$

Because the average voltage of V_{C1} equals V_{IN}, therefore V_{L1} = −V_{L2}. For this reason, the two inductors can be wound on the same core, which begins to resemble a flyback converter, the most basic of the transformer-isolated switched-mode power supply topologies. Since the voltages are the same in magnitude, their effects on the mutual inductance will be zero, assuming the polarity of the windings is correct. Also, since the voltages are the same in magnitude, the ripple currents from the two inductors will be equal in magnitude.

The average currents can be summed as follows (average capacitor currents must be zero):

$I_{D1} = I_{L1} - I_{L2}$

When switch S1 is closed, current I_{L1} increases and the current I_{L2} goes more negative. (Mathematically, it decreases due to arrow direction.) The energy to increase the current I_{L1} comes from the input source. Since S1 is a short while closed, and the instantaneous voltage V_{L1} is approximately V_{IN}, the voltage V_{L2} is approximately −V_{C1}. Therefore, D1 is reverse-biased and blocks current, and capacitor C1 supplies the energy to increase the magnitude of the current in I_{L2} and thus increase the energy stored in L2. I_{RL} is supplied by C2. The easiest way to visualize this is to consider the bias voltages of the circuit in a DC state, then close S1.

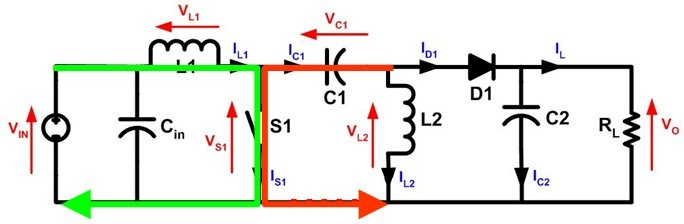
Figure 2: With S1 closed, current increases through L1 (green) and C1 discharges, increasing current in L2 (red)

When switch S1 is opened, the current I_{C1} becomes the same as the current I_{L1}, since inductors do not allow instantaneous changes in current. The current I_{L2} will continue in the negative direction, in fact it never reverses direction. It can be seen from the diagram that a negative I_{L2} will add to the current I_{L1} to increase the current delivered to the load. Using Kirchhoff's current law, it can be shown that I_{D1} = I_{C1} - I_{L2}. It can then be concluded, that while S1 is open, power is delivered to the load from both L2 and L1. C1, however is being charged by L1 during this off cycle (as C2 by L1 and L2), and will in turn recharge L2 during the following on cycle.

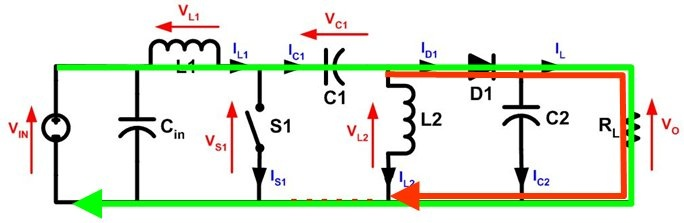
Figure 3: With S1 open, current through L1 (green) and current through L2 (red) produce current through the load

Because the potential (voltage) across capacitor C1 may reverse direction every cycle, a non-polarized capacitor should be used. However, a polarized tantalum or electrolytic capacitor may be used in some cases,because the potential (voltage) across capacitor C1 will not change unless the switch is closed long enough for a half cycle of resonance with inductor L2, and by this time the current in inductor L1 could be quite large.

The capacitor C_{IN} has no effect on the ideal circuit's analysis, but is required in practical regulator circuits to reduce the effects of parasitic inductance and internal resistance of the power supply.

The boost/buck capabilities of the SEPIC are possible because of capacitor C1 and inductor L2. Inductor L1 and switch S1 create a standard boost converter, which generates a voltage (V_{S1}) that is higher than V_{IN}, whose magnitude is determined by the duty cycle of the switch S1. Since the average voltage across C1 is V_{IN}, the output voltage (V_{O}) is V_{S1} - V_{IN}. If V_{S1} is less than double V_{IN}, then the output voltage will be less than the input voltage. If V_{S1} is greater than double V_{IN}, then the output voltage will be greater than the input voltage.

=== Discontinuous mode ===
A SEPIC is said to be in discontinuous-conduction mode or discontinuous mode if the current through either of inductors L1 or L2 is allowed to fall to zero during an operating cycle.

== Reliability and efficiency ==
The voltage drop and switching time of diode D1 is critical to a SEPIC's reliability and efficiency. The diode's switching time needs to be extremely fast in order to not generate high voltage spikes across the inductors, which could cause damage to components. Fast conventional diodes or Schottky diodes may be used.

The resistances in the inductors and the capacitors can also have large effects on the converter efficiency and output ripple. Inductors with lower series resistance allow less energy to be dissipated as heat, resulting in greater efficiency (a larger portion of the input power being transferred to the load). Capacitors with low equivalent series resistance (ESR) should also be used for C1 and C2 to minimize ripple and prevent heat build-up, especially in C1 where the current is changing direction frequently.

== Disadvantages ==
- Like the buck–boost converter, the SEPIC has a pulsating output current. The similar Ćuk converter does not have this disadvantage, but it can only have negative output polarity, unless the isolated Ćuk converter is used.
- Since the SEPIC converter transfers all its energy via the series capacitor, a capacitor with high capacitance and current handling capability is required.
- The fourth-order nature of the converter also makes the SEPIC converter difficult to control, making it only suitable for very slowly varying applications.

== See also ==
- Switched-mode power supply (SMPS)
  - DC-to-DC converter
    - Buck converter
    - Boost converter
    - Buck–boost converter
    - Flyback converter
    - Ćuk converter
