= Glossary of power electronics =

This glossary of power electronics is a list of definitions of terms and concepts related to power electronics in general and power electronic capacitors in particular. For more definitions in electric engineering, see Glossary of electrical and electronics engineering. For terms related to engineering in general, see Glossary of engineering.

The glossary terms fit in the following categories in power electronics:

- Electronic power converters; converters, rectifiers, inverters, filters.
- Electronic power switches and electronic AC power converters; switches and controllers.
- Essential components of electric power equipment; device, stack, assembly, reactor, capacitor, transformer, AC filter, DC filter, snubber circuit.
- Circuits and circuit elements of power electronic equipment; arms and connections.
- Operations within power electronic equipment; commutations, quenchings, controls, angles, factors, states, directions, intervals, periods, frequencies, voltages, breakthroughs and failures, breakdowns, blocking and flows.
- Properties of power electronic equipment
- Characteristic curves of power electronic equipment
- Power supplies

== A ==
AC capacitor
A capacitor essentially designed for operation with alternating voltage. (Note: AC capacitors may be used with dc voltage up to the rated voltage only by permission of the capacitor manufacturer.)
AC conversion factor
For AC conversion, the ratio of the fundamental output power to the fundamental input power.
AC converter
A converter for AC conversion.
AC filter
A filter on the AC side of a converter, designed to reduce the circulation of harmonic currents in the associated system.
AC voltage converter
An AC converter for changing the voltage.
(electronic) AC (power) conversion
Electronic conversion from AC to AC
(electronic) AC/DC (power) conversion
Electronic conversion from AC to DC or vice versa.
AC/DC converter
An electronic converter for rectification or inversion or both.
angle of overlap
The commutation interval expressed in angular measure.
(valve) arm
A part of the circuit of a power converter or switch bounded by any two AC or DC terminals and including one or more simultaneously conducting electronic valve devices connected together and other components if any.
asymmetrical phase control
Phase control with different delay angles in the principal arms of a converter connection or commutating group.
automatic switching on
The property of an equipment having a forced characteristic such that the equipment is switched on automatically.
automatic switching off
The property of an equipment having a forced characteristic such that the equipment is switched off automatically.
auto-sequential commutation
A method of capacitor commutation where the next principal arm to conduct in sequence when turned on connects the capacitor supplying the commutating voltage to the foregoing principal arm.
auxiliary arm
Any valve arm other than a principal arm. (Note: Sometimes an auxiliary arm temporarily fulfills more than one of the following functions: by-pass arm, free-wheeling arm, turn-off arm or regenerative arm.)

== B ==
basic converter connection
The electrical arrangement of principal arms in a converter.
boost converter
step-up converter
A direct DC converter providing an output voltage which is higher than the input voltage.
boost and buck connection
A series connection of two or more converter connections the direct voltages of which may be added or subtracted depending on the control of the individual connections.
breakdown (of an electronic valve device or of a valve arm)
A failure that permanently deprives an electronic valve device or a valve arm of its property to block voltage.
breakthrough
A failure by which a controllable valve device or an arm consisting of such devices loses its ability to block voltage during the forward blocking interval.
bridge connection
A double-way connection of pairs of arms such that the center terminals are the phase terminals of the AC circuit, and that the outer terminals of like polarity are connected together and are the DC terminals.
buck converter
step-down converter
A direct DC converter providing an output voltage which is lower than the input voltage.
by-pass arm
An auxiliary arm providing a conductive path which allows the current to circulate without an interchange of power between source and load.

== C ==
capacitor commutation
A method of self-commutation in which the commutating voltage is supplied by capacitors included in the commutation circuit.
capacitor element (or element)
An indivisible part of a capacitor consisting of two electrodes separated by a dielectric.
capacitor losses
The active power consumed by a capacitor. (Note: Unless otherwise stated, the capacitor, losses will be understood to include losses in fuses and discharge resistors forming an integral part of the capacitor.) (Note: At high frequency, the capacitor losses are predominantly due to losses in connections, contacts, and electrodes.)
capacitor unit (or unit)
An assembly of one or more capacitor elements in the same container with terminals brought out.
capacitor bank
An assembly of two or more capacitor units, electrically connected to each other.
capacitor
A general term used when it is not necessary to state whether reference is made to an element, a unit or a capacitor bank.
capacitor equipment
An assembly of capacitor units and their accessories intended for connection to a network.
circuit angle
In a rectifier connection, the phase angle between the peak of the line to neutral voltage on the AC line side and the simultaneous or next peak of the unsmoothed direct voltage at zero current delay angle.
circuit crest working off-state voltage
The highest instantaneous value of the off-state voltage developed across a controllable valve device or an arm consisting of such devices, excluding all repetitive and non-repetitive transients.
circuit crest working reverse voltage
The highest instantaneous value of the reverse voltage developed across a reverse blocking valve device or an arm consisting of such devices, excluding all repetitive and non-repetitive transient voltages.
circuit non-repetitive peak off-state voltage
The highest instantaneous value of any non-repetitive transient off-state voltage developed across a controllable valve device or an arm consisting of such devices.
circuit non-repetitive peak reverse voltage
The highest instantaneous value of any non-repetitive transient reverse voltage developed across a reverse blocking valve device or an arm consisting of such devices.
circuit repetitive peak off-state voltage
The highest instantaneous value of the off-state voltage developed across a controllable valve device or an arm consisting of such devices, including all repetitive transient voltages but excluding all non-repetitive transient voltages.
circuit repetitive peak reverse voltage
The highest instantaneous value of a reverse voltage developed across a reverse blocking valve device or an arm consisting of such devices, including all repetitive transient voltages but excluding all non-repetitive transient voltages.
circuit reverse blocking interval
The interval during which a reverse blocking valve device or an arm consisting of such devices is in the reverse blocking state.
circuit off-state interval
The interval during which a controllable valve device or an arm consisting of such devices is in the off state.
characteristic (curve) (of a converter)
A curve showing the relationship between the values of the output voltage and the values of the output current.
commutating voltage
The voltage which causes the current to commutate.
commutation
In a power converter the transfer of current from one conducting arm to the next to conduct in sequence, without interruption of the current, both arms conducting simultaneously during a finite time interval.
commutation circuit
The circuit consisting of the commutating arms and the source providing the commutating voltage.
commutating group
A group of principal arms which commutate cyclically among themselves without intermediate commutation of the current to other principal arms.
commutation capacitor
A capacitor included in the commutation circuit to supply commutating voltage.
commutation inductance
The resulting inductance in the commutation circuit.
commutation interval
The time interval in which commutating arms are carrying principal current simultaneously.
commutation failure
A failure to commutate the current from a conducting arm to the succeeding arm.
commutation notch
A periodic voltage transient that may appear in the AC side voltage of a line or machine commutated converter due to the commutation.
commutation number
The number of commutations from one principal arm to another during one elementary period in each commutating group.
commutation reactor
A reactor included in the commutation circuit to increase the commutation inductance.
composite characteristic
A characteristic consisting of parts of the stabilized voltage and stabilized current characteristics.
conducting direction (of an electronic valve device or of a valve arm)
The direction in which an electronic valve device or a valve arm is capable of conducting current.
conduction interval (of a valve arm)
That part of an elementary period in which the valve arm conducts.
conduction ratio
The ratio of the conduction interval to the sum of the conduction interval and the idle interval.
conduction through
In inverter operation, the situation that a valve arm continues conduction at the end of the normal conduction interval or at the end of the hold-off interval.
(electronic) (power) conversion
Change of one or more of the characteristics of an electric power system essentially without appreciable loss of power by means of electronic valve devices. (Note: Characteristics are, for example, voltage, number of phases and frequency including zero frequency.)
(electronic) (power) converter
An operative unit for electronic power conversion, comprising one or more electronic valve devices, transformers and filters if necessary and auxiliaries if any. (Note: In English, the two spellings "convertor" and "converter" are in use, and both are correct. In this document, the spelling "converter" is used in order to avoid duplications.)
converter connection
The electrical arrangement of valve arms and other components essential for the function of the main power circuit of a converter.
converter section of a double converter
That part of a double converter in which the main direct current when viewed from the DC terminals always flows in the same direction.
controllable valve device
A valve device the current path of which is bistably controlled in its conducting direction.
constant current power supply
A power supply that stabilizes output current with respect to changes of influence quantities.
constant voltage power supply
A power supply that stabilizes output voltage with respect to changes of influence quantities.
constant voltage or constant current power supply
A stabilized power supply that operates as a constant voltage power supply or constant current power supply depending on load conditions.
constant voltage to constant current crossover
The behavior of a stabilized power supply that automatically converts the mode of operation from voltage stabilization to current stabilization when the output current reaches a preset value, and vice versa.
continuous flow (of direct current)
A flow of direct current which is not periodically interrupted.
conversion factor (in general)
The ratio of the fundamental output power or DC output power to the fundamental input power or DC input power.
container temperature rise (△θcase) (capacitor)
The difference between the temperature of the hottest point of the container and the temperature of the cooling air.
controlled ideal no-load direct voltage
The theoretical no-load direct voltage of an AC/DC converter corresponding to a specified trigger delay angle assuming no threshold voltages of electronic valve devices and no voltage rise at small loads.
controlled conventional no-load direct voltage
The mean value of the direct voltage corresponding to a specified trigger delay angle which would be obtained by extrapolating the direct voltage/current characteristic from the region of continuous flow of direct current to zero current.
conventional no-load direct voltage
The mean value of the direct voltage which would be obtained by extrapolating the direct voltage/current characteristic. from the region of continuous flow of direct current to zero current at zero trigger delay angle, i.e. without phase control.
cooling-air temperature (θamb) (capacitor)
The temperature of the cooling air measured at the hottest position in the bank, under steady-state conditions, midway between two units. If only one unit is involved, it is the temperature measured at a point approximately 0-1 m away from the capacitor container and at two-thirds of the height from its base.
crossover area
With stabilized power supplies, the range of values of the output quantities within which a change of mode of operation occurs, e.g. from constant voltage to constant current. (Note: Within this area, the output quantities are not well defined.) (Note: Unless otherwise specified, the crossover area is given by the overlap of the load effect bands or of the tolerance bands.)
crossover point
With stabilized power supplies a point given by the intersection of the lines representing the nominal values of the two stabilized output quantities, usually the centre of the crossover area.
current delay angle
The time expressed in angular measure by which the starting instant of current conduction is delayed by phase control.
current pulse width (τ) (capacitor)
Wave Forms

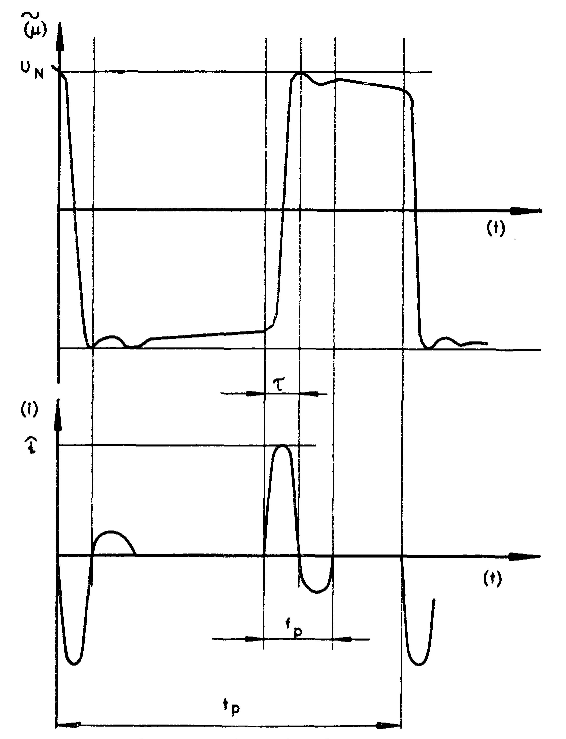
1.A. — A Commutative Diagram.

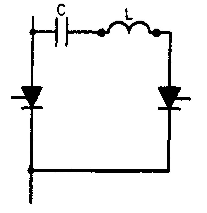
1.B. — Commutating Circuit Example

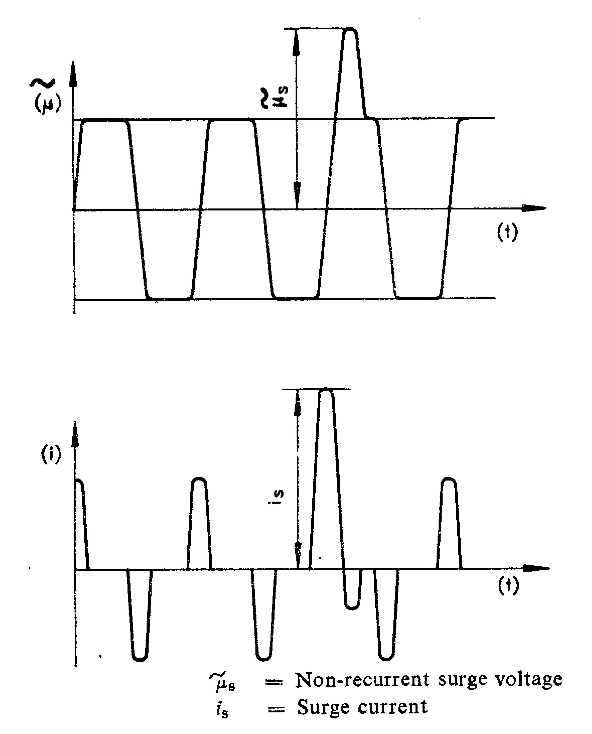
2. — Surge Wave Form

$f_p=\frac{1}{t_p} \qquad \tau=\pi\sqrt{LC}$

τ = capacitor current pulse width
t_{p} = system pulse duration
f_{p} = system pulse frequency
U_{n} = peak recurrent voltage
i = peak current

Fig. 1. Wave Forms
The time of current flow during the charging or discharging from one voltage value to another of the capacitor. (Note: The pulse current waveform example are shown in Fig. 1.)
current source inverter
current fed inverter
A current stiff inverter.
current stiff AC/DC converter
An electronic AC/DC converter having an essentially smooth current on the DC side provided e.g. by means to reduce the harmonic currents.
cycloconverter
A direct frequency converter. (Note: By creating an alternating voltage from successive waves of the higher frequency AC system the cycloconverter provides a lower output frequency.) (Note: By creating an alternating voltage from successive voltage samples of suitable frequency and duration the cycloconverter provides a higher or lower output frequency.)

== D ==
DC capacitor
A capacitor essentially designed for operation with direct voltage. (Note: DC capacitors may be used with ac voltage only by permission of the capacitor manufacturer.)
DC converter
A converter for DC conversion.
DC conversion factor
for DC conversion, the ratio of the DC power value on the load side to that on the source side.
(electronic) DC (power) conversion
Electronic conversion from DC to DC
DC filter
A filter on the DC side of a converter, designed to reduce the ripple in the associated system.
DC form factor
The ratio of the rms value to the mean value averaged over a full period of a periodically varying quantity having a non zero DC component.
DC power
The product of the direct voltage and the direct current (mean values).
DC ripple factor
The ratio of half the difference between the maximum and minimum value of a pulsating direct current to the mean, value of this current. (Note: With low values of the DC ripple factor this quantity is approximately equal to the ratio of the difference to the sum of the maximum and the minimum value.)
direct AC/DC converter
An electronic AC/DC converter without a DC or AC link.
direct AC converter
An AC converter without a DC link.
direct (power) conversion
Electronic conversion without a DC or AC link.
direct DC converter
DC chopper
A DC converter without an AC link.
direct commutation
A commutation between two principal arms without transfer through any auxiliary arms.
direct inverter
An inverter without a DC link.
direct rectifier
A rectifier without a DC or AC link.
direct voltage regulation
The difference between the conventional no-load direct voltage and the direct voltage at load at the same trigger delay angle excluding the correcting effect of stabilizing means if any.
double converter
A current stiff reversible AC/DC converter with direct current in both directions.
double-way connection (of a converter)
A converter connection such that the current through each of the phase terminals of the AC circuit is bidirectional.
duty cycle (capacitor)
1. continuous duty; Operation time such that a capacitor is at thermal equilibrium for most of the time.
2. intermittent duty ; Discontinuous working or operation with variable loads which should be described in terms of ON/OFF or HIGH/LOW periods with their durations.

== E ==
electronic AC (power) switch
An electronic power switch capable of switching alternating current.
electronic AC power controller
A unit which is able to operate as a controllable direct AC voltage converter as well as an electronic AC switch.
electronic DC (power) switch
An electronic power switch capable of switching direct current.
electronic device
A device the function of which is based on charge carriers moving through a semiconductor, a high vacuum or a gas discharge.
elementary frequency
The reciprocal of the elementary period.
elementary period
The duration of one cycle of the phenomena that are periodically repeated.
electronic power filter
active power filter
A converter for filtering.
electronic (power) switching
Switching an electric power circuit by means of electronic valve devices.
electronic (power) switch
An operative unit for electronic power switching comprising at least one controllable valve device.
electronic valve device
An indivisible electronic device for electronic power conversion or electronic power switching, comprising a single non-controllable or bistably controlled unidirectionally conducting current path. (Note: Typical electronic valve devices are thyristors, power rectifier diodes, power switching bipolar and field effect transistors and insulated-gate bipolar transistors (IGBT).) (Note: Two or more electronic valve devices may be integrated on a common semiconductor chip (examples: a thyristor and a rectifier diode in a reverse conducting thyristor, a power switching field effect transistor with its inverse diode) or packaged in a common case (semiconductor power module). These combinations are to be considered as separate electronic valve devices.)
equivalent series resistance of a capacitor
An effective resistance which, if connected in series with an ideal capacitor of capacitance value equal to that of the capacitor in question, would have a power loss equal to the active power dissipated in that capacitor underspecified operating conditions.
external commutation
A commutation where the commutating voltage is supplied by a source outside the converter or electronic switch.
external quenching
A method of quenching in which the quenching results from causes external to the electronic valve device.

== F ==
false firing
The firing of a latching valve device or an arm consisting of such devices at an incorrect instant.
flyback converter
A DC converter where the energy is transferred from the source side to the load side during the idle interval(s) of the controllable principal arm(s) after being stored in an inductance.
firing
The establishment of current in the conducting direction in a latching valve device or an arm consisting of such devices.
firing failure
A failure to achieve conduction in a latching valve device or an arm consisting of such devices during the conduction interval.
forward breakdown
A failure that permanently deprives a controllable valve device or an arm consisting of such devices of its property to block forward voltage.
forward converter
A DC converter where the energy is transferred from the source side to the load side during the conduction interval(s) of the controllable principal arm(s).
four-quadrant converter
An AC/DC or DC converter with two directions of DC power flow, associated with two directions of direct voltage and two directions of direct current.
free-wheeling arm
A by-pass arm containing only non-controllable valve devices.
frequency converter
An AC converter for changing the frequency. (Note: An AC converter for changing both the frequency and the voltage and possibly the number of phases is also called a frequency converter.)
forced characteristic (of a line commutated converter)
A characteristic obtained by additional means, e.g. stabilization, with specified variation limits of influence quantities.
fully controllable connection
A uniform connection with all principal arms controllable.
fundamental factor
The ratio of the rms value of the fundamental component to the rms value of the alternating quantity.
fundamental power
The active power determined by the fundamental components of voltage and current.

== H ==
half-controllable connection
A non-uniform connection with half the number of principal arms controllable.
harmonic content
The quantity obtained by subtracting from an alternating quantity its fundamental component.
(total) harmonic factor
The ratio of the rms value of the harmonic content of an alternating quantity to the r.m.s. value of the quantity.
high vacuum valve device
An electronic valve device in which the degree of vacuum is so high that the effects of ionization are negligible.
hold-off interval
The interval between the instant when the on-state current of a latching valve device has decreased to zero and the instant when the same valve device is subjected to reapplied off-state voltage.

== I ==
indirect AC converter
An AC converter with a DC link.
indirect AC/DC converter
An electronic AC/DC converter with a DC or AC link.
indirect commutation
A series of commutations from one principal arm to another or back to the original one by successive commutations via one or more auxiliary arms.
indirect (power) conversion
Electronic conversion with one or more DC or AC link(s).
indirect current link AC converter
An AC converter with a current stiff DC link .
indirect DC converter
A DC converter with an AC link.
indirect inverter
An inverter with a DC link.
indirect rectifier
A rectifier with a DC or AC link.
indirect voltage link AC converter
An AC converter with a voltage stiff DC link.
inductive direct voltage regulation
The direct voltage regulation due to the commutation inductance(s).
influence quantity
In the field of power electronics any quantity generally external to a power supply which may affect its performance.
inherent delay angle
The current delay angle occurring, even without phase control, caused by multiple overlap. (Note: Multiple overlap occurs in line commutated converters at high angles of overlap.)
inherent direct voltage regulation
The direct voltage regulation excluding the effect of the AC system impedance.
intermittent flow (of direct current)
A flow of direct current which is periodically interrupted.
internal discharge device
A device incorporated in the capacitor connecting the terminals of the unit, capable of reducing the residual voltage effectively to zero after the capacitor has been disconnected from the supply.
internal (element) fuse
A device incorporated in the capacitor which disconnects an element or a group of elements in the event of breakdown.
insulation voltage (Ui)
The RMS rated value of the insulation voltage of capacitive elements and terminals to case or earth. If not specified, the RMS value of the insulating voltage is equivalent to the rated voltage divided by a square root of 2.
interphase transformer
An electromagnetic device enabling the operation in parallel of two or more phase displaced commutating groups through inductive coupling between the windings placed, on the same core.
inversion factor
For inversion, the ratio of the fundamental output power to the DC power.
ideal no-load direct voltage
The theoretical no-load direct voltage of an AC/DC converter assuming no reduction by phase control, no threshold voltages of electronic valve devices, and no voltage rise at small loads.
idle interval (of a valve arm)
That part of an elementary period in which the valve arm does not conduct.
ionic valve device
filled valve device
An electronic valve device in which the effects of the ionization of a gas play an important role.
(electronic) (power) inversion
Electronic conversion from DC to AC
inverter
AC/DC converter for inversion. (Note: In English, the two spellings "invertor" and "inverter" are in use, and both are correct. In this article, the spelling "inverter" is used in order to avoid duplications.)

== J ==
jumping characteristic
The property of an equipment to jump from one characteristic to another, e.g. by changing the predetermined value of a stabilizing device.

== L ==
latching valve device
A controllable valve device which latches when it is turned on, that means it remains in the on state when the trigger signal has ended. (Note: Most latching valve devices can be turned off only by suppressing the current through the conducting path by external means.) (Note: A gate turn-off (GTO) thyristor is a latching valve device which can be turned off by a control signal.) (Note: A latching valve device may be reverse blocking or non-reverse blocking.)
line commutation
An external commutation where the commutating voltage is supplied by the line.
load commutation
An external commutation where the commutating voltage is taken from a load other than the line.
lowest operating temperature (θmin) (capacitor)
The lowest temperature at which the capacitormay be energized.

== M ==
machine commutation
External commutation where the commutating voltage is supplied by a rotating machine.
maximum current (Imax) (capacitor)
The maximum RMS current for continuous operation.
maximum loss power (Pmax) (capacitor)
The maximum loss power with which the capacitor may be loaded at the maximum case temperature.
maximum operating temperature (θmax) (capacitor)
The highest temperature of the case at which capacitor may be operated.
maximum peak current (i) (capacitor)
The maximum current amplitude which occurs instantaneously during continuous operation.
maximum surge current (is) (capacitor)
The admissible peak current induced by a switching or any other disturbance of the system which is allowed for a limited number of times.
metal-foil capacitor (non self-healing)
A capacitor in which the electrodes usually consist of metal foils separated by a dielectric, in the event of breakdown of the dielectric, the capacitor does not restore itself.
model capacitor
A smaller unit which simulates a complete unit or element in an electrical test, without reducing the severity of the electrical, thermal or mechanical conditions. (Note: The sum of stresses should always be considered, for instance, the sum of temperature, mechanical conditions and electrical stresses.)
multi-connected converter
A converter consisting of two or more converter units parallel connected or series connected or both, each of which is an operative converter of its own.
multiple connection (of commutating groups)
A connection in which two or more identical commutating groups which do not commutate simultaneously are connected in such a way that their direct currents add.
multicycle control
The process of varying the ratio of the number of cycles which include current conduction to the number of cycles in which no current conduction occurs.
multicycle control factor
The ratio between the number of conducting cycles and the sum of conducting and non-conducting cycles in the case of multicycle control.

== N ==
natural characteristic (of a line commutated converter)
A characteristic determined only by the basic parts of the equipment, e.g. transformer and valve device assembly.
non-conducting direction (of an electronic valve device or of a valve arm)
The reverse of the conducting direction.
non-controllable connection
A uniform connection with all principal arms non-controllable.
non-controllable valve device
rectifier diode
A reverse blocking valve device the current path of which conducts in its conducting direction without any control signal being applied.
non-recurrent surge voltage (Us) (capacitor)
A peak voltage induced by a switching or any other disturbance of the system which is allowed for a limited number of times and for durations shorter than the basic period.
non-reverse blocking valve device
A controllable valve device which is not capable of blocking any voltage of more than several volts in its non-conducting direction. (Note: In certain power electronic circuits such valve devices require means to suppress any reverse voltages, e.g. inverse parallel connected non-controllable valve devices (rectifier diodes).)
non-uniform connection
A connection with both controllable and non-controllable principal arms.

== O ==
off state
forward blocking state
The non-conducting state of a controllable valve device or an arm consisting of such devices when load current in the conducting direction is not allowed to flow due to the absence of a turn-on signal.
on state
conducting state
The condition when conducting current flows through an electronic valve device or an arm.
one-quadrant converter
An AC/DC or DC converter with one possible direction of DC power flow.
operating temperature (capacitor)
The temperature of the hottest point on the case of the capacitor in thermal equilibrium.
overpressure disconnector
A disconnecting device designed to interrupt the current path in the case of abnormal increase of the internal pressure.

== P ==
pair of antiparallel arms
Two valve arms in parallel with opposite conducting directions.
pair of arms
Two series connected valve arms with the same conducting direction.
parallel operation
A mode of operation of stabilized power supplies in which all similar output terminals are connected together and arranged so that the total load is shared by all the supplies.
phase control factor
In the case of phase control, the ratio of the voltage at prevailing current delay angle to the voltage at zero current delay angle, all voltage drops being assumed to be zero.
phase converter
An AC converter for changing the number of phases.
phase control
The process of varying the instant within the cycle at which current conduction in an electronic valve device or a valve arm begins.
power electronic capacitor
A power capacitor intended to be used in power electronic equipment and capable of operating continuously under non-sinusoidal current or voltage.
power electronics
The field of electronics which deals with the conversion or switching of electric power with or without control of that power.
principal arm
A valve arm involved in the major transfer of power from one side of the converter or electronic switch to the other. (Note: Depending on the mode of operation a principal arm may act as an auxiliary arm or vice versa.)
pulse control
The process of varying the starting or termination instants or both of a repeated current conduction in a principal arm.
pulse control factor
The conduction ratio of a principal arm in the case of pulse duration control, assuming the commutation inductance to be zero.
pulse frequency (fp) (capacitor)
The repetition rate of periodic current pulses.
pulse frequency control
Pulse control at variable frequency and fixed pulse duration.
pulse frequency control
Pulse control at variable frequency and fixed pulse duration.
pulse number
The number of non-simultaneous symmetrical direct or indirect commutations from one principal arm to another which occur during one elementary period.
pulse width modulation control
PWM control (abbreviation)
Pulse control in which the pulse width or frequency or both are modulated within each fundamental period to produce a certain output waveform.

== Q ==
quenching
The termination of current flow in an arm without commutation.
quenching voltage
The voltage which causes quenching of the current.

== R ==
reactive power converter
A converter for reactive power compensation that generates or consumes reactive power without the flow of active power except for the power losses in the converter.
rated AC voltage (Un) (capacitor)
The maximum operating peak recurrent voltage of either polarity of a reversing type waveform for which the capacitor has been designed. (Note: The waveform can have many shapes — An example is given in Fig. 1.) (Note: The mean value of the waveform may be positive or negative.) (Note: The nominal voltage is not a RMS value.)
rated DC voltage (Un) (capacitor)
The maximum operating peak voltage of either polarity but of a non-reversing type wave form, for which the capacitor has been designed, for continuous operation.
real no-load direct voltage
The actual mean direct voltage at zero direct current.
(electronic) (power) rectification
Electronic conversion from AC to DC
rectification factor
For rectification, the ratio of the DC power to the fundamental input power.
rectifier
An AC/DC converter for rectification.
regenerative arm
A valve arm which transfers a part of the power from the load side to the source side.
(electronic) (power) resistance control
Control using the continuous variation of the resistance of electronic devices.
resistive direct voltage regulation
The direct voltage regulation due to resistance (threshold voltages of electronic valve devices excluded).
resonant converter
A converter using (a) resonant circuit(s) to provide commutation or to reduce switching losses.
resonant frequency (fr) (capacitor)
The lowest frequency at which the impedance of the capacitor becomes minimum.
reversible converter
A converter in which the direction of the power flow is reversible.
reverse blocking state
the non-conducting state of a reverse blocking valve device or an arm consisting of such devices when reverse voltage is applied between its main terminals (electrodes).
reverse blocking valve device
A valve device which is capable of blocking a specified direct voltage applied in its non-conducting direction.
reverse breakdown
A failure that permanently deprives a reverse blocking valve device or an arm consisting of such devices of its property to block reverse voltage.
ripple voltage (on the DC side)
The peak-to-peak alternating voltage component of the voltage on the DC side of a converter.

== S ==
slave operation
A mode of operation of stabilized power supplies achieving coordinated control of interconnected stabilized supplies by setting the master supply alone.
self-commutation
A commutation where the commutating voltage is supplied by components within the converter or the electronic switch.
self-healing metallized dielectric capacitor
A capacitor, the electrodes of which are deposited on the dielectric (usually by evaporation); in the event of breakdown of the dielectric, the capacitor restores itself.
semiconductor converter
An power converter with semiconductor valve devices. (Note: Similar terms are used for converters in general or for specific kinds of converters and for converters with other or specific electronic valve devices, e.g. thyristor converter, transistor inverter.)
semiconductor switch
An electronic power switch with semiconductor valve devices. (Note: Similar terms are used for electronic switches or power controllers with specific electronic valve devices, e.g. thyristor controller, transistor switch.)
semiconductor valve device
An electronic valve device which is a semiconductor device.
sequential phase control
Asymmetrical phase control such that the delay angles are determined according to a given sequence.
single converter
A current stiff reversible AC/DC converter with direct current in one direction.
single-way connection (of a converter)
A converter connection such that the current through each of the phase terminals of the AC circuit is unidirectional.
snubber (circuit)
A subcircuit connected to one or more electronic valve devices in order to relieve it (them) of stress as for instance overvoltage transients, switching losses, high rate of rise of current or voltage, etc. (Note: Specific terms as for instance RC snubber, parallel snubber, AC side snubber, etc. are in use.)
stabilized current characteristic
A characteristic with a stabilized output current.
stabilized output characteristic
A forced characteristic with an output quantity which is stabilized with respect to changes of influence quantities.
stabilized voltage characteristic
A characteristic with a stabilized output voltage.
stabilization
In the field of power electronics the reduction of the effect of changes of influence quantities on the output quantity.
stabilized power supply
In the field of power electronics an equipment which takes electrical energy from a source and supplies it stabilized by means inside the equipment to one or more pairs of output terminals.
stage (of a series connection)
A part of a series connection of two or more converter connections consisting of one or more parallel connected converter connections.
steady-state condition (capacitor)
Thermal equilibrium attained by the capacitor at constant output and at constant cooling-air temperature.
symmetrical phase control
Phase control with equal delay angles in all principal arms of a fully controllable converter connection or commutating group.
switched valve device
A controllable valve device which may be turned on and off by a control signal.

== T ==
tangent of the loss angle (tanδ) of a capacitor
The ratio between the equivalent series resistance and the capacitive reactance of a capacitor at specified sinusoidal alternating voltage and frequency.
threshold voltage (of an electronic valve device)
The value of the voltage obtained at the intersection of the voltage axis and the straight line approximation of the on-state characteristic of an electronic valve device.
transfer factor (of a DC converter)
The ratio of the voltage on the load side and the voltage on the source side.
transition current
The mean direct current of a converter connection when the direct current(s) of the commutation group(s) become(s) intermittent when decreasing the current.
trigger advance angle
The time expressed in angular measure by which the trigger pulse is advanced with respect to the reference instant. (Note: With line, machine or load commutated converters the reference instant is the zero crossing instant of the commutating voltage.)
trigger delay angle
The time expressed in angular measure by which the trigger pulse is delayed with respect to the reference instant in the case of phase control. (Note: With line, machine or load commutated converters the reference instant is the zero crossing instant of the commutating voltage. With AC controllers it is the zero crossing instant of the supply voltage. For AC controllers with inductive loads the trigger delay angle is the sum of the phase shift and the current delay angle.)
triggering
The control action to achieve firing of a latching valve device or an arm consisting of such devices.
tolerance band
With stabilized power supplies the range of steady-state values of a stabilized output quantity lying between specified limits of deviation from a preset value, e.g. a nominal value.
total direct voltage regulation
The direct voltage regulation including the effect of the AC system impedance.
total harmonic distortion THD
The ratio of the rms value of the harmonic content of an alternating quantity to the rms value of the fundamental component of the quantity.
turn-off arm
An auxiliary arm which temporarily takes over the current directly from a conducting valve arm, consisting of one or more latching valve devices which cannot be turned off by a control signal.
two-quadrant converter
An AC/DC or DC converter with two possible directions of DC power flow associated with one direction of direct current and two directions of direct voltage or vice versa.

== U ==
uniform connection
A connection with either all principal arms controllable or all principal arms non-controllable.

== V ==
valve device assembly
An electrically and mechanically combined assembly of electronic valve devices or stacks, complete with all its connections and auxiliaries in its own mechanical structure. (Note: Similar terms are applied to stacks or assemblies comprising specific electronic valve devices, e.g. diode stack (rectifier diodes only), thyristor assembly (thyristors only or in combination with rectifier diodes).)
valve device blocking
An operation to prevent further turn-on of a controllable valve device or an arm consisting of such devices by inhibiting the control signals.
valve device commutation
A method of self-commutation in which the commutating voltage is created by turning off the conducting electronic valve device by a control signal. (Note: Simultaneously the next electronic valve device to conduct is turned on.)
valve device quenching
A method of quenching in which the quenching is performed by the electronic valve device itself.
valve device stack
A single structure of one or more electronic valve devices with its (their) associated mounting(s) and auxiliaries if any.
voltage stiff AC/DC converter
An electronic AC/DC converter having an essentially smooth voltage on the DC side provided e.g. by a low impedance path for the harmonic currents.
voltage source inverter
voltage fed inverter
A voltage stiff inverter.

== Overview of electronic power converters ==
Examples of basic electronic power converters.

== See also ==
- Glossary of engineering
- Glossary of civil engineering
- Glossary of mechanical engineering
- Glossary of structural engineering
