= Joule thief =

Voltage booster electronic circuit

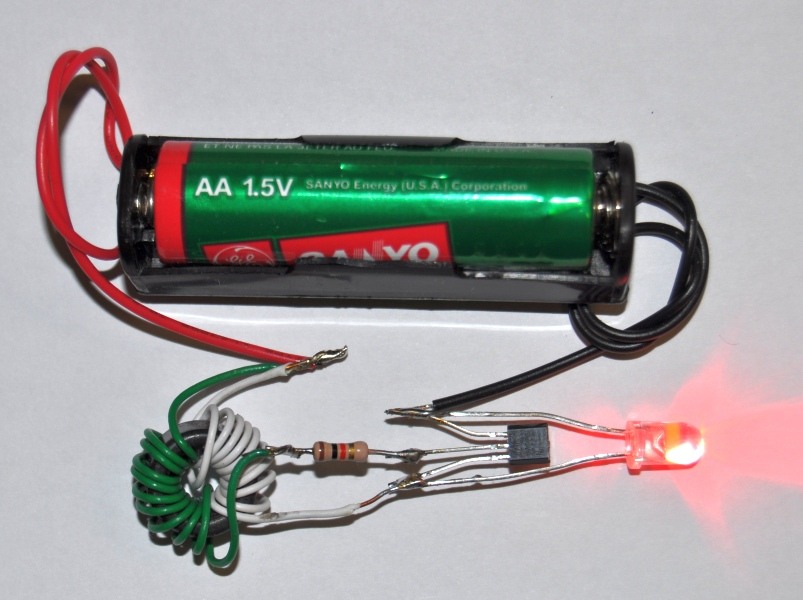
A conventional joule thief, showing components and how they are connected. This example uses a red LED. A ferrite toroid is wound to form a coil with primary (white) and feedback (green) windings. A PN2222A transistor and 1000 ohm resistor are used.

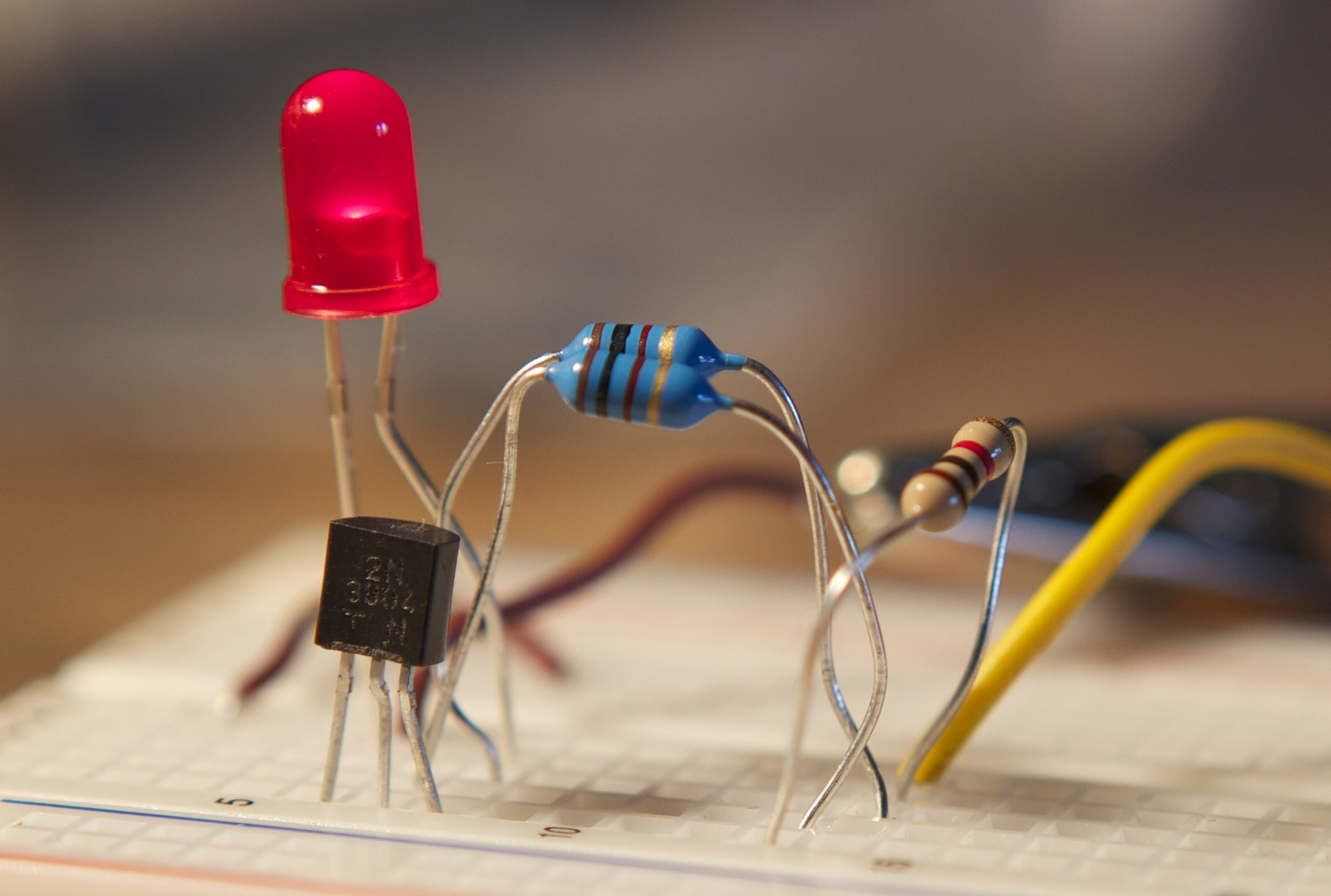
A joule thief with two axial inductors replacing the ferrite toroid, shown on a solderless breadboard

A joule thief is a minimalist self-oscillating voltage booster that is small, low-cost, and easy to build, typically used for driving small loads, such as driving an LED using a 1.5 volt battery. It can use nearly all of the energy in a single-cell electric battery, even far below the voltage at which other circuits consider the battery fully discharged (or "dead"); hence the name, which suggests the notion that the circuit is "stealing" energy or "joules" from the source – the term is a pun on "jewel thief".

The circuit is a variant of the blocking oscillator that forms an unregulated voltage boost converter.

== History ==
The joule thief is not a new concept. It adds an LED to the output of a self-oscillating voltage booster, which was patented many decades ago.

- US patent 1949383, filed in 1930, "Electronic device", describes a vacuum tube based oscillator circuit to convert a low voltage into a high voltage.
- US patent 2211852, filed in 1937, "Blocking oscillator apparatus", describes a vacuum tube based blocking oscillator.
- US patent 2745012, filed in 1951, "Transistor blocking oscillators", describes three versions of a transistor based blocking oscillator.
- US patent 2780767, filed in 1955, "Circuit arrangement for converting a low voltage into a high direct voltage".
- US patent 2881380, filed in 1956, "Voltage converter".
- US patent 4734658, filed in 1987, "Low voltage driven oscillator circuit", describes a very low voltage driven oscillator circuit, capable of operating from as little as 0.1 volts (lower voltage than a joule thief will operate). This is achieved by using a JFET, which does not require the forward biasing of a PN junction for its operation, because it is used in the depletion mode. In other words, the drain–source already conducts, even when no bias voltage is applied. This patent was intended for use with thermoelectric power sources.

In November 1999 issue of Everyday Practical Electronics (EPE) magazine, the "Ingenuity Unlimited" (reader ideas) section had a novel circuit idea entitled "One Volt LED - A Bright Light" by Z. Kaparnik from Swindon, Wiltshire, UK. Three example circuits were shown for operating LEDs from supply voltages below 1.5 volts. The basic circuits consisted of a transformer-feedback NPN transistor voltage converter based on the blocking oscillator. After testing three transistors (ZTX450 at 73% efficiency, ZTX650 at 79%, and BC550 at 57%), it was determined that a transistor with lower V_{ce(sat)} yielded better efficiency results. Also, a resistor with lower resistance would yield a high current.

== Operation ==
Joule thief with regulated output voltage

Example of a joule thief circuit driving an LED. The coil consists of a standard ferrite toroid core with two windings of 20 turns each using 0.15 mm (0.006 inch) diameter wire (38 swg) (34-35 AWG). The circuit can utilize an input voltage down to about 0.35 V and can run for weeks using a 1.5 V LR6/AA. The battery voltage is usually 1.5 V. The resistor is ~1 kΩ, 1/4 W. The transistor could be a 2N3904, BC547B, 2SC2500, BC337, 2N2222, 2N4401 or other NPN. V_{ceo}= 30 V, P= 0.625 W.

A closed-loop regulated joule thief

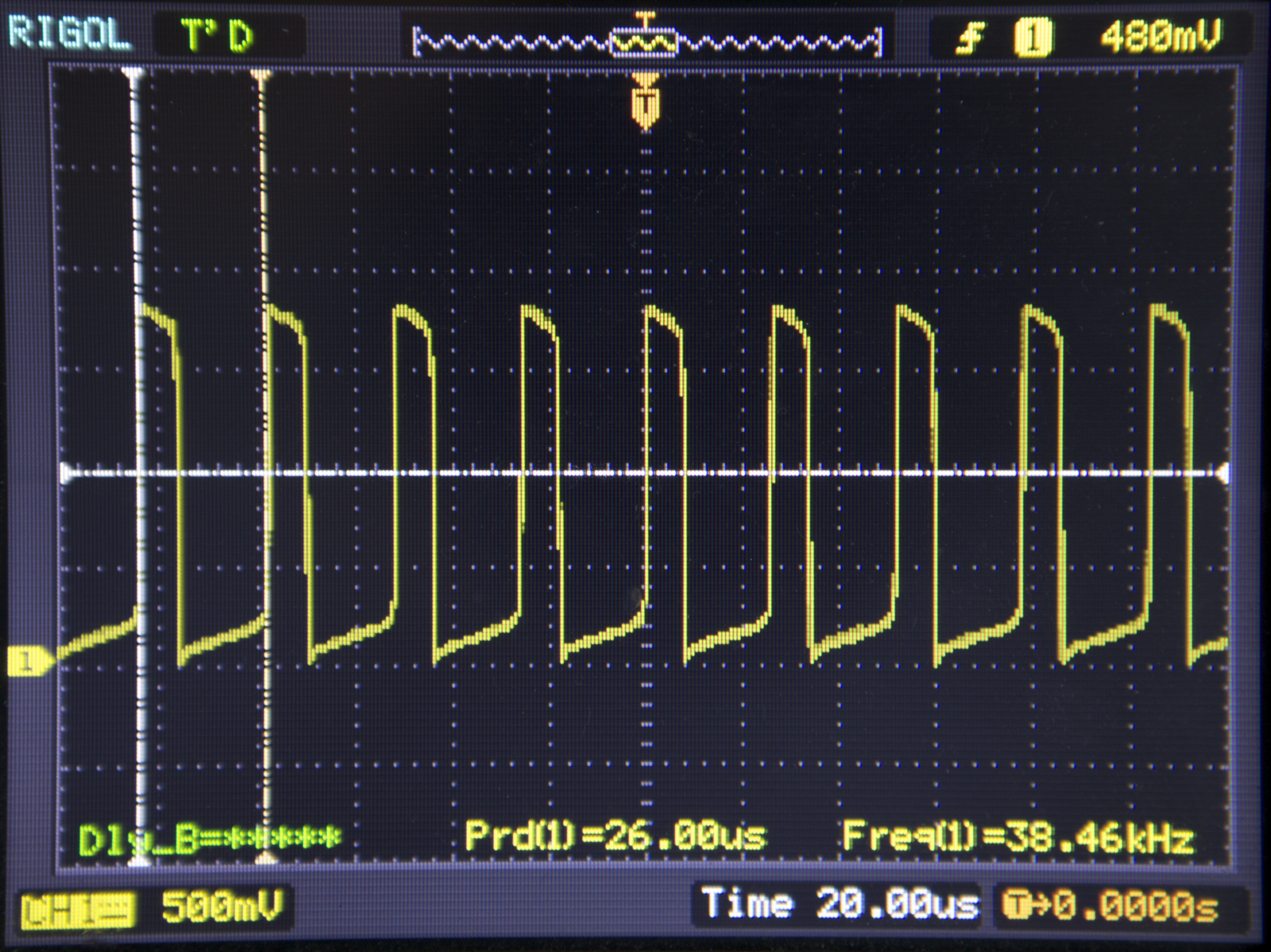
The waveform of an operating joule thief, showing a 30% duty cycle at approximately 40 kHz

The circuit works by rapidly switching the transistor. Initially, current begins to flow through the resistor, secondary winding, and base-emitter junction (see diagram) which causes the transistor to begin conducting collector current through the primary winding. Since the two windings are connected in opposing directions, this induces a voltage in the secondary winding which is positive (due to the winding polarity, see dot convention) which turns the transistor on with higher bias. This self-stoking/positive-feedback process almost instantly turns the transistor on as hard as possible (putting it in the saturation region), making the collector-emitter path look like essentially a closed switch (since V_{CE} will be only about 0.1 volts, assuming that the base current is high enough). With the primary winding effectively across the battery, the current increases at a rate proportional to the supply voltage divided by the inductance. Transistor switch-off takes place by different mechanisms dependent upon supply voltage. The gain of a transistor is not linear with V_{CE}. At low supply voltages (typically 0.75 V and below) the transistor requires a larger base current to maintain saturation as the collector current increases. Hence, when it reaches a critical collector current, the base drive available becomes insufficient; the transistor starts to pinch off; and the previously described positive feedback action occurs, turning it hard off. To summarize, once the current in the coils stops increasing for any reason, the transistor goes into the cutoff region (and opens the collector-emitter "switch"). The magnetic field collapses, inducing however much voltage is necessary to make the load conduct, or for the secondary-winding current to find some other path. When the field is back to zero, the whole sequence repeats; with the battery ramping-up the primary-winding current until the transistor switches on. If the load on the circuit is very small the rate of rise and ultimate voltage at the collector is limited only by stray capacitances, and may rise to more than 100 times the supply voltage. For this reason, it is imperative that a load is always connected so that the transistor is not damaged. Because V_{CE} is mirrored back to the secondary, failure of the transistor due to a small load will occur through the reverse V_{BE} limit for the transistor being exceeded (this occurs at a much lower value than V_{CE}max). The transistor dissipates very little energy, even at high oscillating frequencies, because it spends most of its time in the fully on or fully off state, so either voltage over or current through the transistor is zero, thus minimizing the switching losses.

A simple modification of the previous schematic replaces the LED with three components to create a simple zener diode based voltage regulator. Diode D1 acts as a half-wave rectifier to allow capacitor C to charge up only when a higher voltage is available from the joule thief on the left side of diode D1. The Zener diode D2 limits the output voltage. As there is no regulation, any excess of energy not consumed by the load, will be dissipated as heat in the zener diode with consequent low efficiency of conversion.

When a more constant output voltage is desired, the joule thief can be given a closed-loop control. In the example circuit, the Schottky diode D1 blocks the charge built up on capacitor C1 from flowing back to the switching transistor Q1 when it is turned on. A 5.6 volt Zener diode D2 and transistor Q2 forms the feedback control: when the voltage across the capacitor C1 is higher than the threshold voltage formed by Zener voltage of D2 plus the base-emitter turn-on voltage of transistor Q2, transistor Q2 is turned on diverting the base current of the switching transistor Q1, impeding the oscillation and prevents the voltage across capacitor C1 from rising even further. When the voltage across C1 drops below the threshold voltage Q2 turns off, allowing the oscillation to happen again. This very simple circuit has the drawback of temperature-dependent output voltage due to BJT2 (Vbe), and a relatively high ripple, but can be filtered with a simple LC pi network with low losses. In the example circuit, is included a low dropout regulator which contributes to regulating further the output voltage and lowers the ripple, but has the penalty of low conversion efficiency.

== See also ==
- Blocking oscillator – Electronic circuit
- Flyback converter – Type of voltage converter circuit
- Forward converter – Type of voltage converter circuit
- Switched-mode power supply – Power supply with switching regulator
