= Glossary of industrial automation =

This glossary of industrial automation is a list of definitions of terms and illustrations related specifically to the field of industrial automation. For a more general view on electric engineering, see Glossary of electrical and electronics engineering. For terms related to engineering in general, see Glossary of engineering.

== A ==
abbreviated address calling
Calling that enables a user to employ an address having fewer characters than the full address when initiating a call. (Note: Networks may allow a user to designate a given number of abbreviated address codes. The allocation of abbreviated address codes to a destination or group of destinations may be changed as required by means of a suitable procedure.)
absolute coordinates
The absolute distances or angles that specify the position of a point with respect to the datum of a coordinate system.
absolute coordinate
One of the coordinates that identify the position of an addressable point with respect to the origin of a specified coordinate system.
absolute error
The algebraic result of subtracting a true, specified or theoretically correct value from the computed, observed, measured or achieved value.
absolute instruction
A display command using absolute coordinates.
absolute position sensor
A sensor that gives directly the coordinate position of an element of a machine.
absolute programming
Programming using words indicating absolute dimensions (absolute coordinates).
absolute vector
A vector whose start and end points are specified in absolute coordinates.
acceleration
Rate of change of the velocity at the point under consideration per unit of time.
accuracy
A qualitative assessment of freedom from error or of the degree of conformity to a desired value, a high assessment corresponding to a small error.
active accommodation
Type of control in which the combination of sensor outputs, control commands, and robot motion is used to achieve alteration of a robot's preprogrammed motions in response to sensed inputs (e.g, used to stop a robot when forces reach set levels, or to perform force feedback tasks like insertions, door opening and edge tracing).
active devices
Devices which require a power supply independent of the value of input signals.
active output
Output the power of which in all possible states of the device is derived from supply power.
actual conditions
Conditions observed during operation.
actuator
A power mechanism used to effect motion of the robot (e.g. a motor which converts electrical, hydraulic or pneumatic energy to effect motion of the robot).
adaptive control
A control scheme that adjusts the control system parameters from conditions detected during the process.
address (in numerical control)
A character, or group of characters, at the beginning of a word, that identifies the data following in the word.
address block format
A block format in which each word contains an address.
address tabulation block format
A tabulation block format in which each word contains an address.
addressable point
Any point of a device that can be addressed.
aiming field
On a display surface, a circle or other pattern of light used to indicate the area in which the presence of a light-pen can be detected at a given time.
alignment function character
The character ":" used as the address character for a sequence number word that indicates a block in a control tape after which are recorded the data necessary for machining to be commenced or recommenced.
alignment pose
A specified pose of the mechanical interface coordinate system in relation to the base coordinate system.
ambient temperature
Temperature of the environment in which the apparatus is working.
amplification
Ratio between the output signal variations and the control signal variations (for analogue devices only).
amplifier
Any device that increases the magnitude of an applied signal. It receives an input signal and delivers a larger output signal that, in addition to its increased amplitude, is a replica of the input signal. (Note: Energy may be fluid power as well as electric energy.)
analog data
Data a represented by a physical quantity that is considered to be continuously variable and whose magnitude is made directly proportional to the data or to a suitable function of the data.
analog input channel amplifier
An amplifier attached to one or more analog input channels, that adapts the analog signal level to the input range of the succeeding analog-to-digital converter.
analog input channel (in process control)
The analog data path between the connector and the analog-to-digital converter in the analog input subsystem. (Note: This path may include a filter, an analog signal multiplexer, and one or more amplifiers.)
analog output channel amplifier
An amplifier attached to one or more analog output channels, that adapts the output signal range of the digital-to-analog converter to the signal level necessary to control the technical process. (Note: If there is a common digital-to-analog converter in the subsystem, the amplifier performs the function of a sample-and-hold device.)
analog representation
A representation of the value of a variable by a physical quantity that is considered to be continuously variable, the magnitude of the physical quantity being made directly proportional to the variable or to a suitable function of the variable.
analogue anplifier
Amplifier the output of which is continuously variable with the applied control signal.
anisochronous transmission
A data transmission process in which there is always an integral number of unit intervals between any two significant instants in the same group; between two significant instants located in different groups, there is not always an integral number of unit intervals. (Note: In data transmission the group is a block or a character.)
answering
The process of responding to a calling station to complete the establishment of a connection between data stations.
anti-vibration mounting
Device for insulating machine vibrations from the structure upon which it is mounted.
argument (in numerical control)
Data which qualifies a command.
arm (primary axes)
An interconnected set of links and powered joints comprising members of longitudinal shape which supports, positions and orientates the wrist and/or an end effector.
articulated structure
Set of links and joints which constitutes the arm and the wrist.
asynchronous transmission
Data transmission in which the time of occurrence of the start of each character, or block of characters, is arbitrary; once started, the time of occurrence of each signal representing a bit within the character, or block, has the same relationship to significant instants of a fixed time base.
attained pose
The pose achieved by the robot in response to the command pose.
automatic
Pertaining to a process or device that, under specified conditions, functions without human intervention.
automatic answering
Answering in which the called data terminal equipment (DTE) automatically responds to the calling signal. (Note: The call may be established whether or not the called DTE is attended.)
automatic calling (in a data network)
Calling in which the elements of the selection signal are entered into the data network contiguously at the full data signaling rate. (Note: The selection signal is generated by the data terminal equipment. A limit may be imposed by the design criteria of the network to prevent more than a permitted number of unsuccessful call attempts to the same address within a specified period of time.)
automatic control
Control method which operates without human intervention.
automatic cycle
Cycle of operations which, once started, repeats indefinitely until stopped.
automatic mode
The operating mode in which the robot control system can operate in accordance with the task program.
autcmatic mode of operation
The mode of operation of a numerically controlled machine in which it operates in accordance with the control data until stopped by the program or the operator.
automation
The implementation of processes by automatic means.
axis
1. A direction in which a part of a robot can move in a linear or rotary mode. The number of axes is normally the number of guided and mutually independently driven links. (Note: Axis is also used to describe a mechanism of a robot.)
2. A direction in which a part of a machine can move in a linear or rotary mode.

== See also ==
- Glossary of engineering
- Glossary of power electronics
- Glossary of civil engineering
- Glossary of mechanical engineering
- Glossary of structural engineering
