= Resonant converter =

Type of electric power converter

Schematic of a typical LLC converter. C1: input capacitor. Q1 and Q2: switching transistors. C2, L1 and L2 are the tank circuit. L2 is often replaced with the transformer primary. T1: coupling transformer. D1 and D2: rectifier diodes. C3: output capacitor.

A resonant converter is a type of electric power converter, typically AC-to-DC or DC-to-DC, that is based around a circuit tuned to resonate at a specific frequency, called a resonant tank. As this circuit typically consists of two inductors and a capacitor, they are also referred to as LLC resonant converters. This resonant circuit is powered by the input, made to oscillate by a switching circuit, and one of the inductors is either part of or connected to a transformer, which magnetically couples to the output.

The use of a resonant circuit allows higher switching frequencies (in the hundreds of kHz) than a typical switched-mode power supply (typically under 100 kHz), which result in several advantages. The high frequency results in reduced switching losses and therefore an increase in conversion efficiency (nearing 98%), and a reduction in component size and in the amount of electrical noise generated. This means they can be smaller, lighter and more efficient than a comparable switching supply, and they find use in applications requiring large amounts of power.

Since the 2000s they have found applications in power demanding applications such as electric vehicle chargers, power conversion for solar energy, and hydrogen hydrolysis, as well as power supplies for consumer electronics where there is a high power requirement or a space constraint.

There are multiple types of resonant converter, depending on the topology and the switching method:

- Series resonant converter
- Parallel resonant converter
- Class E resonant converter
- Class E resonant rectifier
- Zero-voltage switching resonant converter
- Zero-current switching resonant converter
- Two-quadrant ZVS resonant converter
- Resonant DC-link inverter

== See also ==
- Inverter
- Switched-mode power supply
