= Off line regulator =

An off line regulator, off-line regulator, or offline regulator is an electronic voltage regulation or current regulation device that is designed to directly accept electric power obtained from an alternating current utility power source. That is "off the mains voltage line".

This electronics design terminology has no relationship to the use of "online and offline" for computers and networking, and no relationship with uninterruptible power supplies that provide power while disconnected from the electrical grid.

An off line regulator can be a complete integrated circuit with all capabilities necessary to provide clean power to a small portable or handheld device, or it may be used as part of a larger switched mode power supply (SMPS) or DC-DC converter.

== Characteristics ==
The convert input must be able to accept power at line voltage. Although AC line voltage is commonly referred to by its RMS value, such as 120 V or 240 V, the peak voltage of the sine wave is around ±170 V for 120 V RMS and ±339 V for 240 V RMS.

Additionally, 120 V and 240 V are considered nominal voltages; the actual voltage provided by a utility may be somewhat higher or lower during normal operation. The range of this variability is generally within the ±5% range required by ANSI standard C84.1 (114–126 V and 228–252 V respectively). This pushes the peak line voltage up to ±178 V for 120 V and ±356 V for 240 V.

Off line regulators must also be tolerant of voltage spikes, surges, brownouts, and other power quality conditions that may affect the electronic device.
