= Vibrator (electronic) =

Electromechanical device

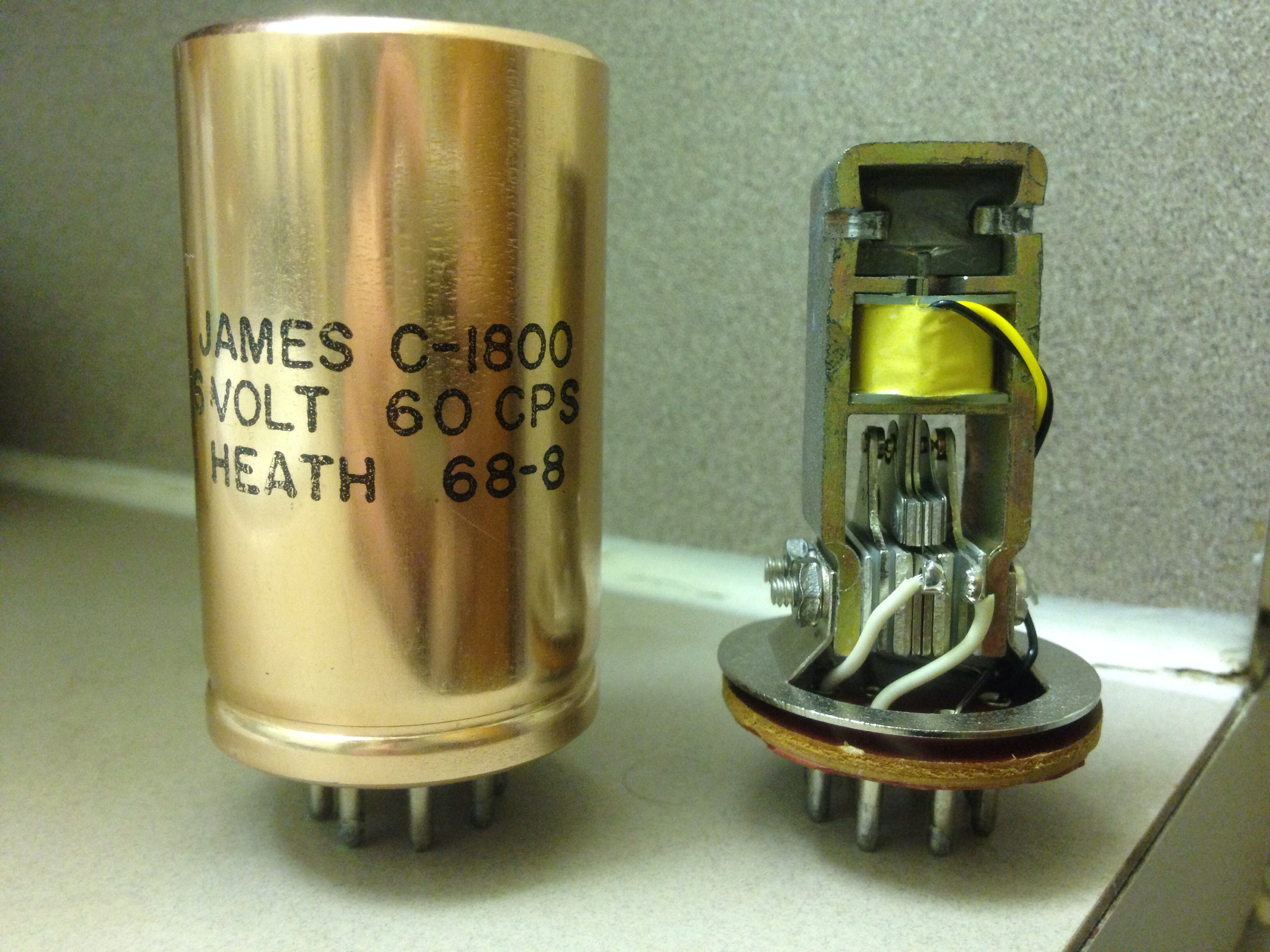
A pair of Heathkit-brand vibrators manufactured by James Electronics, with octal bases. The one on the right has been stripped of the aluminum cap so the inner components can be seen.

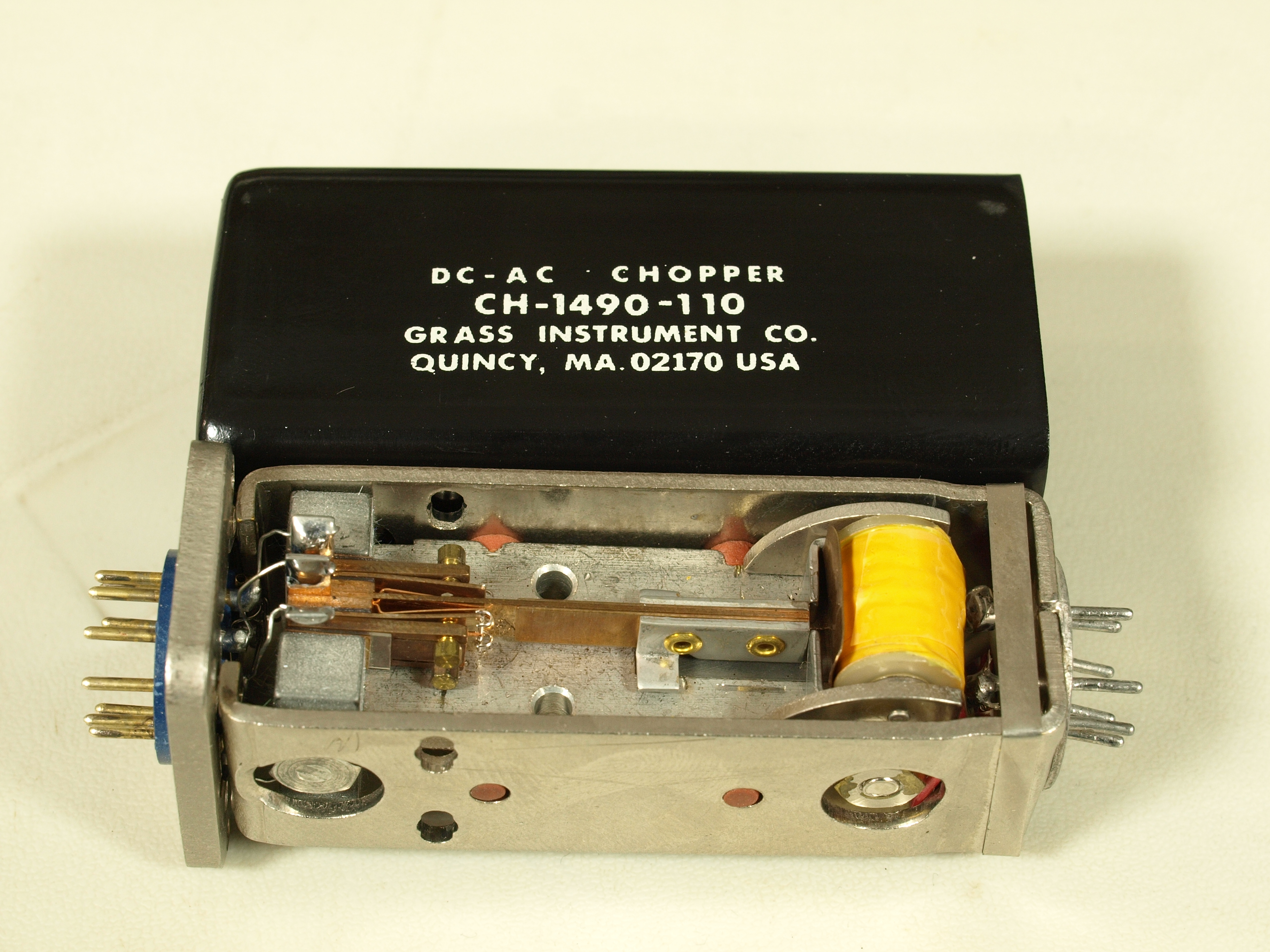
An electro-mechanical vibrator from the Grass Instrument Co. Used as part of a chopper amplifier in polygraph input amplifier.

A vibrator is an electromechanical device that takes a DC electrical supply and converts it into pulses that can be fed into a transformer. It is similar in purpose (although greatly different in operation) to the solid-state power inverter.

Before the development of switch-mode power supplies and the introduction of semiconductor devices operating off low voltage, there was a requirement to generate voltages of about 50 to 250 V DC from a vehicle's battery. A vibrator was used to provide pulsating DC which could be converted to a higher voltage with a transformer, rectified, and filtered to create higher-voltage DC. It is essentially a relay using normally closed contacts to supply power to the relay coil, thus immediately breaking the connection, only to be reconnected very quickly through the normally closed contacts. It happens so rapidly it vibrates, and sounds like a buzzer. This same rapidly pulsing contact applies the rising and falling DC voltage to the transformer which can step it up to a higher voltage.

The primary use for this type of circuit was to operate vacuum tube radios in vehicles, but it also saw use with other mobile electronic devices with a 6 or 12 V accumulator, especially in places with no mains electricity supply such as farms. These vibrator power supplies became popular in the 1940s, replacing more bulky motor-generator systems for the generation of AC voltages for such applications. Vacuum tubes require plate voltages ranging from about 45 volts to 250 volts in electronic devices such as radios. For portable radios, hearing aids and similar equipment, B batteries were manufactured with various voltage ratings. In order to provide the necessary voltage for a radio from the typical 6 or 12 volt DC supply available in a car or from a farm lighting battery, it was necessary to convert the steady DC supply to a pulsating DC and use a transformer to increase the voltage.

Vibrators often experienced mechanical malfunctions, being constantly in motion, such as the springs losing tension, and the contact points wearing down. As tubes began to be replaced by transistor based electrical systems, the need to generate such high voltages began to diminish. Mechanical vibrators fell out of production near the end of the 20th century, but solid-state electronic vibrators are still manufactured to be backwards compatible with older units.

== Use ==
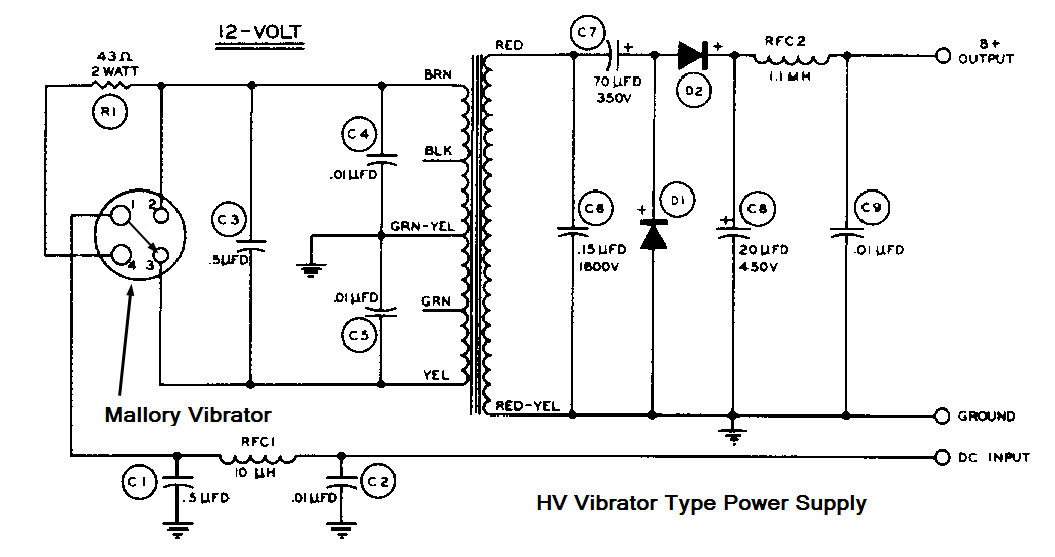
Schematic diagram of a typical circuit to convert low voltage DC to high voltage DC

The vibrator was a device with switch contacts mounted at the ends of flexible metal strips. In operation, these strips are vibrated by an electromagnet, causing the contacts to open and close rapidly. The contacts interrupt the 6 or 12V direct current from the battery to form a stream of pulses which change back and forth from 0 volts to the battery voltage, effectively generating a square wave. Unlike a steady direct current, when such a pulsating current is applied to the primary winding of a transformer it will induce an alternating current in the secondary winding, at a pre-determined voltage based on the turn ratio of the windings. This current can then be rectified by a thermionic diode, a copper-oxide/selenium rectifier, or by an additional set of mechanical contacts (in which case the vibrator acts as a type of synchronous rectifier). The rectified output is then filtered, ultimately producing a DC voltage typically much higher than the battery voltage, with some losses dissipated as heat. This arrangement is essentially an electromechanical inverter circuit.

The vibrator's primary contacts alternately make and break current supply to the transformer primary. As it is impossible for the vibrator's contacts to change over instantaneously, the collapsing magnetic field in the core will induce a high voltage in the windings and will cause sparking at the vibrator's contacts. This would erode the contacts very quickly, so a snubber capacitor with a high voltage rating (C8 in the diagram) is added across the transformer secondary to damp out the unwanted high-voltage "spikes".

Since vibrators wore out over time, they were usually encased in a steel or aluminum "tin can" enclosure with a multi-pin plug at the bottom (similar to the contact pins on vacuum tubes), so they could be quickly unplugged and replaced without using tools.

Vibrators generate a certain amount of audible noise (a constant buzzing sound) while in operation, which could potentially be heard by passengers in the car while the radio was on. To help contain this sound within the vibrator's enclosure, the inside surface of the can was often lined with a thick soundproofing material, such as foam rubber. Since vibrators were typically plugged into sockets mounted directly on the radio chassis, the vibration could potentially be mechanically coupled to the chassis, causing it to act as a sounding-board for the noise. To prevent this, the sound-deadening lining inside the can was sometimes made thick enough to support the vibrator's components by friction alone. The components were then connected to the plug pins by flexible wires, to further isolate the vibration from the plug.

== See also ==
- Boost converter
- Chopper
- Mechanical rectifier
- Multivibrator
- Reed relay
- Switched-mode power supply
