= Metal rectifier =

Early type of semiconductor rectifier

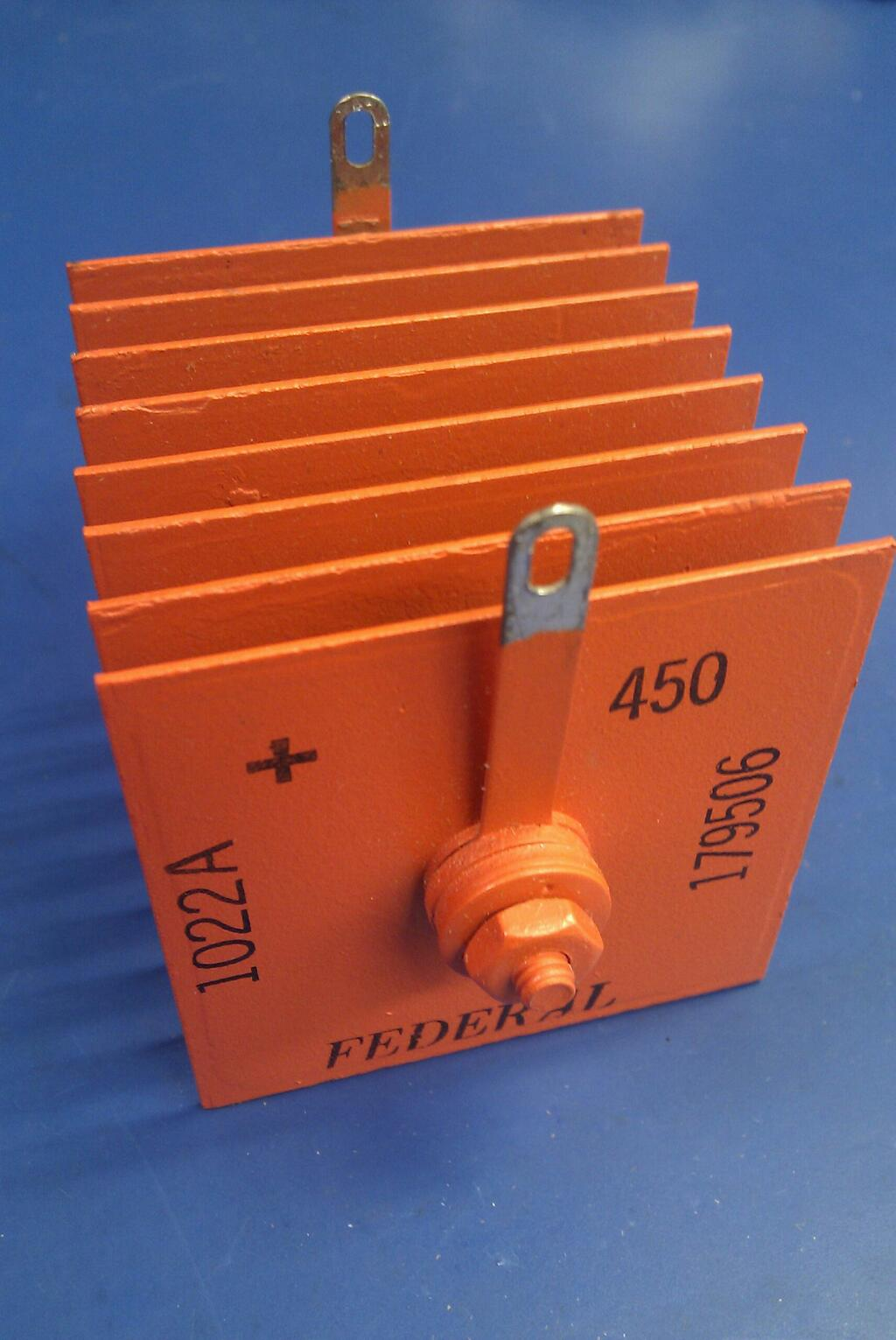
Selenium rectifier. Eight-plate 160 V 450 mA Federal brand

A metal rectifier is an early type of semiconductor rectifier in which the semiconductor is copper oxide, germanium or selenium. They were used in power applications to convert alternating current to direct current in devices such as radios and battery chargers. Westinghouse Electric was a major manufacturer of these rectifiers since the late 1920s, under the trade name Westector (now used as a trade name for an overcurrent trip device by Westinghouse Nuclear).

In some countries the term "metal rectifier" is applied to all such devices; in others the term "metal rectifier" normally refers to copper-oxide types, and "selenium rectifier" to selenium-iron types.

== Description ==
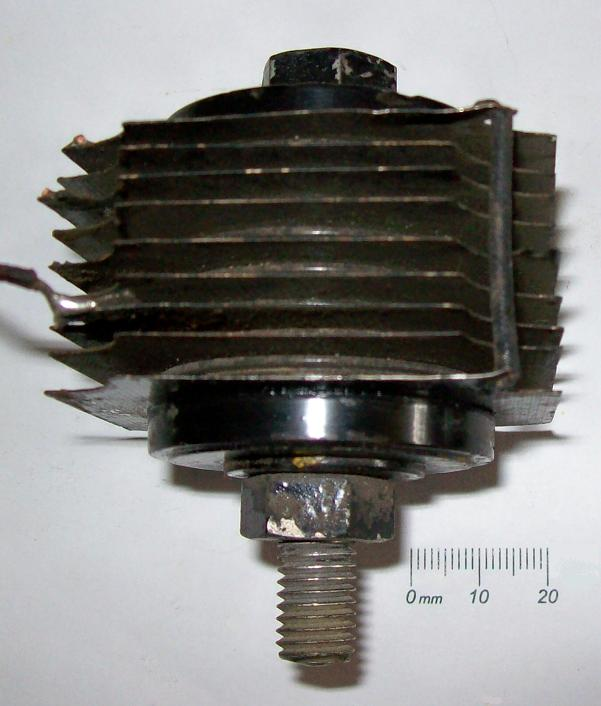
Copper-oxide rectifier

Metal rectifiers consist of washer-like discs of different metals, either copper (with an oxide layer to provide the rectification) or steel or aluminium, plated with selenium. The discs are often separated by spacer sleeves to provide cooling.

== Mode of operation ==
The principle of operation of a metal rectifier is related to modern semiconductor rectifiers (Schottky diodes and p–n diodes), but somewhat more complex. Both selenium and copper oxide are semiconductors, in practice doped by impurities during manufacture. When they are deposited on metals, it would be expected that the result is a simple metal–semiconductor junction and that the rectification would be a result of a Schottky barrier. However, this is not always the case: Siegfried Poganski discovered in the 1940s that the best selenium rectifiers were in fact semiconductor-semiconductor junctions between selenium and a thin cadmium selenide layer, generated out of the cadmium-tin metal coating during processing. In any case the result is that there is a depletion region in the semiconductor, with a built-in electric field, and this provides the rectifying action.

== Performance ==
Compared to later silicon or germanium devices, copper-oxide rectifiers tended to have poor efficiency, and the reverse voltage rating was rarely more than a few volts. A number of rectifier discs would need to be used in series to provide an adequate reverse breakdown voltage figure, and a bridge rectifier for a 12 V battery charger would often use 12 metal rectifiers. Selenium rectifiers were generally more efficient than metal-oxide types, and could handle higher voltages. However, considerably more skill was required for their construction.

== Applications ==
=== Radio receivers ===
Metal rectifiers were also used as envelope detector (AM demodulator) diodes in radio receivers. The WX6 Westector was a typical example. It was about the size and shape of an AAA battery, with threaded posts at each end to which connections were made.

Selenium rectifiers were once widely used as high-voltage rectifiers in transformerless radio and TV sets, before cheaper silicon diodes became available. Although they were reasonably efficient in this application, (at least compared to vacuum-tube rectifiers), their internal resistance tended to increase as they aged. Apart from reducing the available high voltage, this tends to make them run hotter, producing an unpleasant smell as the selenium starts to evaporate.

=== TV sets and photocopiers ===
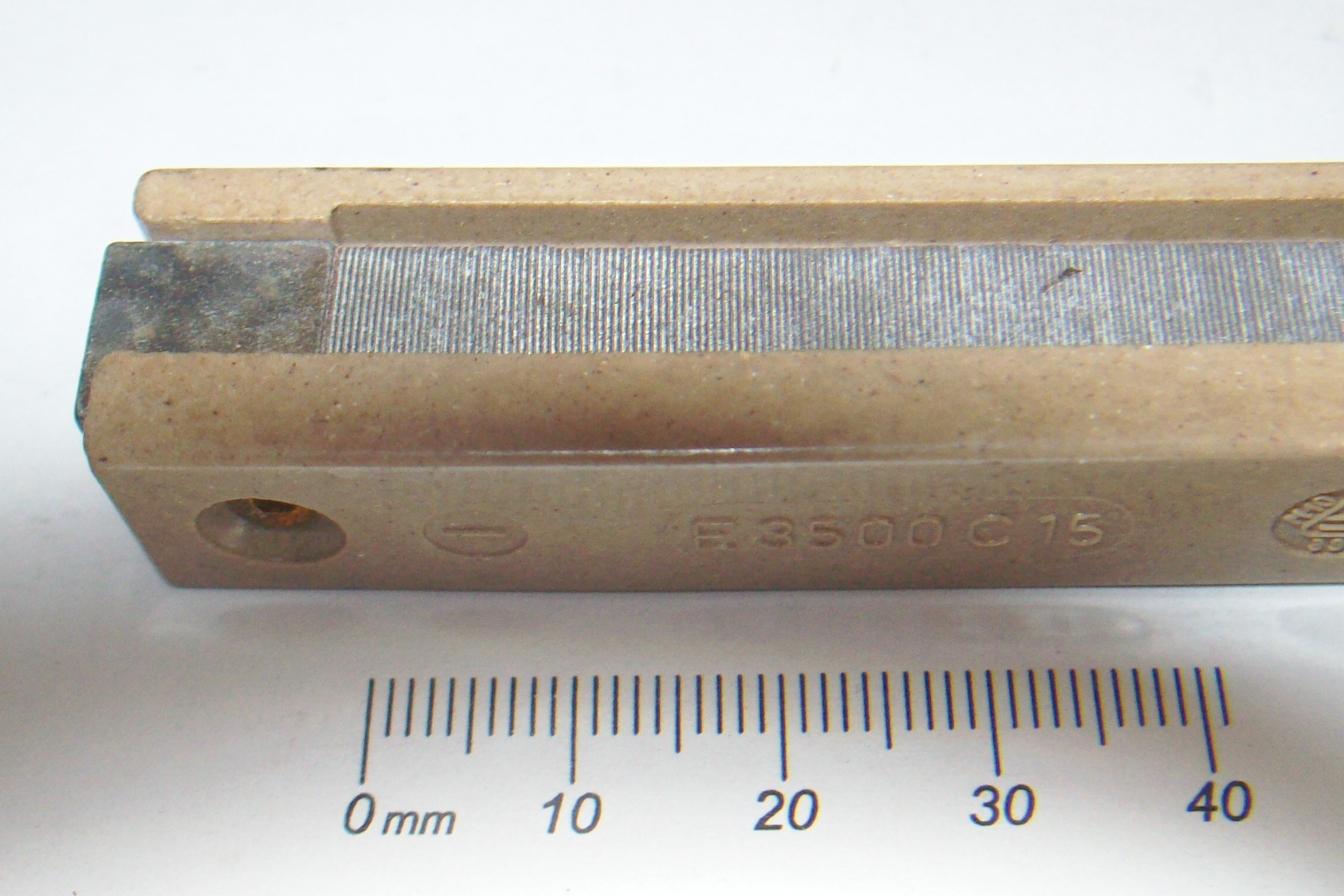
High-voltage selenium rectifier

Specially designed selenium rectifiers were once widely used as EHT rectifiers in television sets and photocopiers. A layer of selenium was applied to a sheet of soft iron foil, and thousands of tiny discs (typically 2 mm diameter) were punched out of this and assembled as "stacks" inside ceramic tubes. Rectifiers capable of supplying tens of thousands of volts could be made this way. Their internal resistance was extremely high, but most EHT applications only required a few hundred microamps at most, so this was not normally an issue. With the development of inexpensive high voltage silicon rectifiers, this technology has fallen into disuse.

=== Electrolysis ===
Metal rectifiers have been replaced by silicon diodes in most devices, however there are certain applications where the replacement of metal rectifiers with silicon units has proven impractical. These are mostly in electroplating, aluminium smelting and similar high-current low-voltage industrial applications, where the lower forward voltage drop of metal rectifiers is more important than their reverse breakdown voltage.
