= Wellington Street (Montreal) =

Thoroughfare in Montreal, Canada

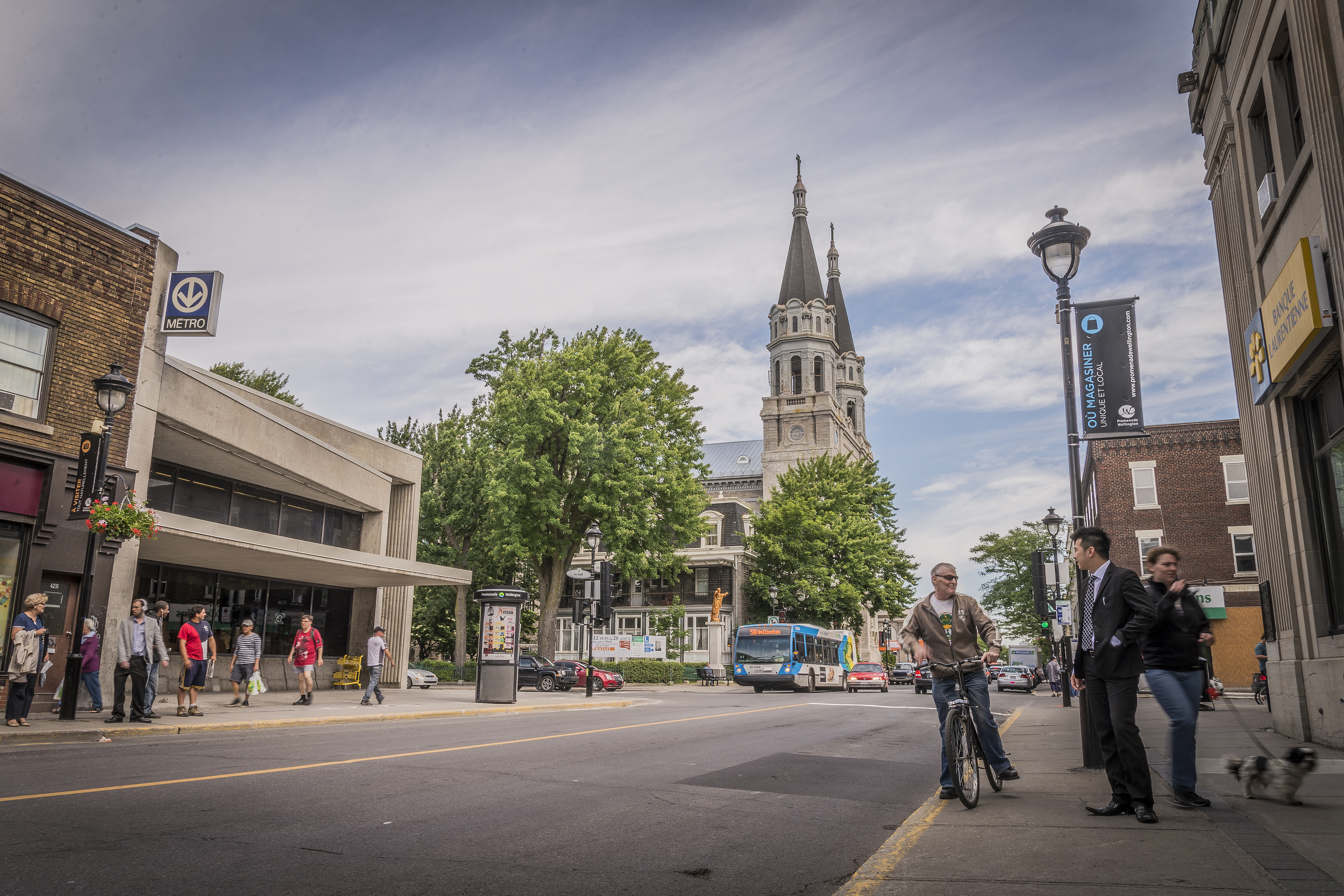
- Interactive map of Wellington Street
- Native name: rue Wellington (French)
- Part of: R-112
- Owner: City of Montreal
- Length: 5.7 km (3.5 mi)
- Location: Montreal
- Coordinates: 45.4760°N 73.5602°W
- West end: Boulevard LaSalle, Verdun
- East end: Rue McGill, Old Montreal

Wellington Street (officially in French: Rue Wellington) is an east-west thoroughfare located in Montreal, Quebec, Canada. It starts at LaSalle Boulevard in the borough of Verdun, passes through Pointe-Saint-Charles and Griffintown in the borough of Le Sud-Ouest, and terminates at McGill Street in Old Montreal in the borough of Ville-Marie. Wellington Street spans 5.7 km (3.5 mi) in length.

De L'Église métro station is located on the street.

Wellington Street is named for Arthur Wellesley, 1st Duke of Wellington (1769–1852), a British field marshal and two-time prime minister of the United Kingdom. The Duke of Wellington is best known for having defeated Napoleon I of France in the Battle of Waterloo in June 1815.

Wellington Street serves as a shopping district for the borough of Verdun and most of the neighbourhood of Pointe Saint-Charles. It is primarily industrial between the railroad tracks in Pointe Saint-Charles and the Bonaventure Expressway. The electrical substation Poste Adélard-Godbout and the De L'Église metro station are sited on the street.

== Points of interest ==
- Square des Frères-Charon
- Marguerite Bourgeoys Park
- St. Ann Park
