= Sevcon =

Sevcon Inc.
- Trade name: Sevcon Inc. (former Tech/Ops Sevcon before 2011)
- Company type: Public
- Traded as: Nasdaq: SEV
- Industry: Electric vehicles
- Founded: 1961; 65 years ago
- Founder: Sir Horace William Heyman
- Fate: Acquired by BorgWarner in 2017
- Successor: BorgWarner
- Headquarters: Gateshead, United Kingdom
- Area served: Worldwide
- Products: Microprocessor controls for electric vehicles
- Owner: Tech/Ops, Inc.
- Website: sevcon.com
- Footnotes / references Ticker SEV was allocated to Electric Car company Sono Motors.

Sevcon Inc. was an eProducts company, that manufactured controls for electric vehicles. In September 2017, Sevcon was acquired by BorgWarner.

== History ==
=== Early years ===
Sevcon Engineering Ltd. was founded in 1961. The company was formed to develop technology originated by Horace William Heyman (13 March 1912 - 4 September 1998), who had been managing director of Smith Electric Vehicles from 1949 until 1964. It was the largest manufacturer of electric vehicles in Europe.

Heyman's technology improved battery life for frequent start-stop runs of electric vehicles at low speeds. There were always large electrical losses on starting an electric vehicle because of electrical resistances heating up. The technology allowed a 20% reduction in battery size for equivalent power, or increased battery length or power for a standard-sized battery.

An electric vehicle would have had resistances to drop the voltage on the motor when starting, but this created heating. His technology employed semiconductor-controlled rectifiers, with a semiconductor oscillator, which provided pulses of electrical power to power the motor.

It opened its first subsidiary in 1968 in Paris. In 1969 it was bought by Tech/Ops of the US.

It won the Queen's Award to Industry in April 1970, and the Queen's Awards for Export in April 1975. A new factory opened in June 1970 at Team Valley, Gateshead.

In 1988 it was listed on the US stock exchange, then joined the NASDAQ Capital Market in 2009. In 2011 the NASDAQ ticker was changed from TO (Tech/Ops Sevcon, Inc.) to SEV (Sevcon, Inc.).

=== Later years ===
In 2014 Sevcon entered into a joint venture Chinese tier-one automotive supplier to form Sevcon New Energy Technology. However, in June 2016 the 50% equity was bought out by Sevcon to become wholly owned by Sevcon, Inc.

In February 2016, Sevcon acquired an Italian battery charger business, adding an additional facility based in Italy to Sevcon.

=== Acquisition by BorgWarner ===
In September 2017, following a period of rapid expansion, Sevcon was acquired by BorgWarner. From January 2019, the development and operations of the majority of the former Sevcon products was transferred to the BorgWarner (formerly Sevcon) facility in Lugo Italy.

== Structure ==
The parent company Sevcon, Inc. was based in Boston, Massachusetts, US. With the Sevcon Ltd. UK head office situated opposite the automotive centre of Gateshead College on the Team Valley trading estate. In 2017 at the time of the acquisition by BorgWarner, Sevcon had additional sales and engineering facilities in France, Japan, South Korea and China.

At various times it outsourced much of the manufacture of its components to Fideltronik in Poland, SRX in Malaysia and KeyTronic in Mexico & China. A subsidiary, ICW Ltd, manufactures film capacitors in Wrexham, UK. This subsidiary was later sold to Charcroft.

Products were sold direct to OEM manufacturers, or through an extensive network of distributors.
