= Warsaw rectifier =

AC to DC conversion circuit

The Warsaw rectifier is a pulse-width modulation (PWM) rectifier invented by Włodzimierz Koczara in 1992.

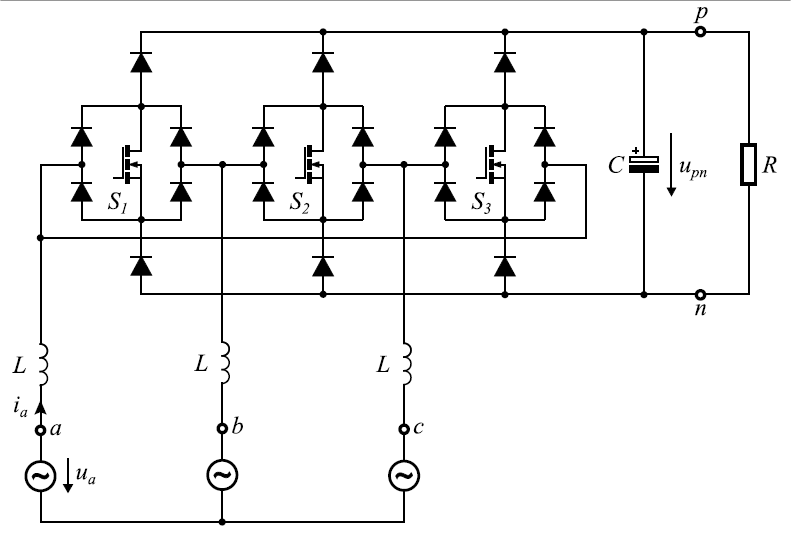
Fig. 1: Schematic of Warsaw Rectifier topology

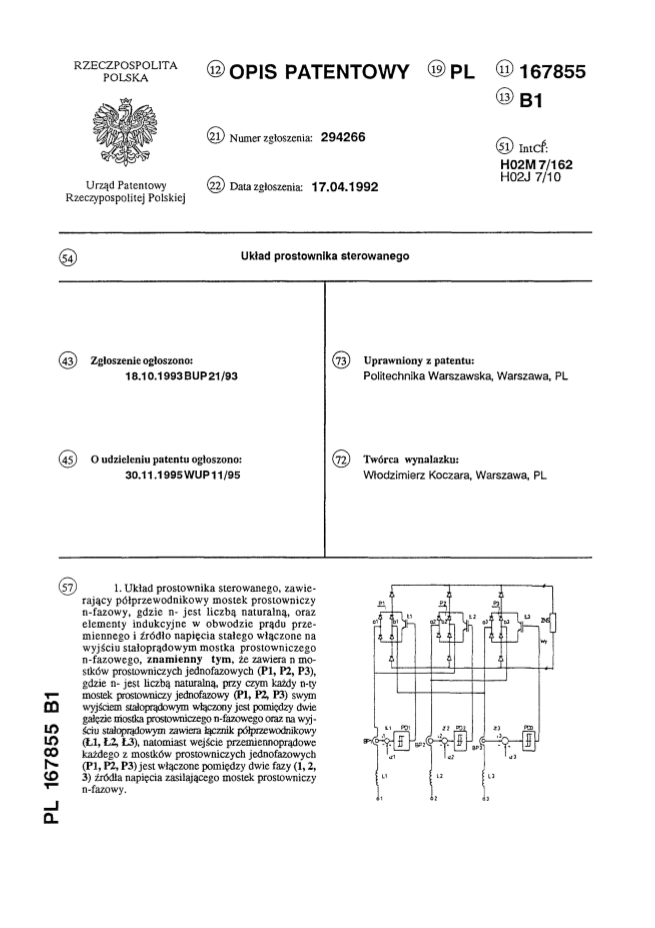
Fig. 2: Patent PL167855 scan

== Features ==
The Warsaw Rectifier provides the following features:

- Unity power factor
- Three-wire input, which does not require a connection to the neutral wire
- Ohmic behaviour
- Controlled output voltage
- Simple control scheme
- Low power losses

Unique features of the Warsaw Rectifier:

- Short circuits do not cause current to flow through switches
- No cross-short circuiting of switches possible
- Dead time is not required

== Topology ==
The Warsaw rectifier is a unidirectional, three-phase, three-switch two-level pulse-width modulation (PWM) rectifier. This topology uses three insulated-gate field-effect transistors (IGFET) and eighteen diodes. The bidirectional switches (composed of four diodes and one IGFET circuit) are connected in a delta topology. The rectifier output does not require a divided DC-link circuit as required in the Vienna rectifier topology.

== See also ==
- Vienna rectifier
