= PWM rectifier =

AC to DC power converter

PWM rectifier (pulse-width modulation rectifier) is an AC to DC power converter, that is implemented using forced commutated power electronic semiconductor switches. Conventional PWM converters are used for wind turbines that have a permanent-magnet alternator.

Today, insulated gate bipolar transistors are typical switching devices. In contrast to diode bridge rectifiers, PWM rectifiers achieve bidirectional power flow. In frequency converters this property makes it possible to perform regenerative braking. PWM rectifiers are also used in distributed power generation applications, such as microturbines, fuel cells and windmills.

The major advantage of using the pulse width modulation technique is the reduction of higher order harmonics. It also makes it possible to control the magnitude of the output voltage, and improve the power factor by forcing the switches to follow the input voltage waveform using a PLL loop. Thus, we can reduce the total harmonic distortion (THD).

== Types of PWM rectifiers ==
- Warsaw rectifier (invented 1992)
- Vienna rectifier (invented 1993)
