= IEC 61000-3-2 =

Standard on mains voltage

IEC 61000-3-2 Electromagnetic compatibility (EMC) – Part 3-2: Limits – Limits for harmonic current emissions (equipment input current ≤ 16 A per phase) is an international standard that limits mains voltage distortion by prescribing the maximum value for harmonic currents from the second harmonic up to and including the 40th harmonic current. IEC 61000-3-2 applies to equipment with a rated current up to 16 A – for equipment above 16 A see IEC 61000-3-12.

Meanwhile, the 5th edition of IEC 61000-3-2:2018 has been published.

The analog European standard is called EN 61000-3-2.

Although the limit values shown below were taken from a previous edition (IEC 61000-3-2:2005+A1:2008+A2:2009), which is obsolete, they give a good impression of how electrical equipment is tested with the aim to reduce mains pollution, reduce transmission loss and mains voltage waveform distortion.

== Background ==
With the emergence of large scale distributed electronic devices, first the radio with electronic valves, and later TV and Personal Computers, there has been a fundamental problem with mains pollution by harmonic currents. All mentioned electronic apparatus need a smoothed DC voltage as supply. A 100 or 120 Hz ripple on the DC voltage is almost inevitable, especially in the early days of electronics, but it could give hum in speakers of audio equipment and vertical, slowly moving dark and light modulation on TV screens. A simple and cheap means of getting low ripple is to use a relatively inexpensive electrolytic capacitor with high capacitance values, direct coupled after the mains voltage rectifier. Smoothing the DC voltage can also be effected by inductors, but these are much more expensive, and have relatively large size, and large weight, but would generate much less harmonic currents.

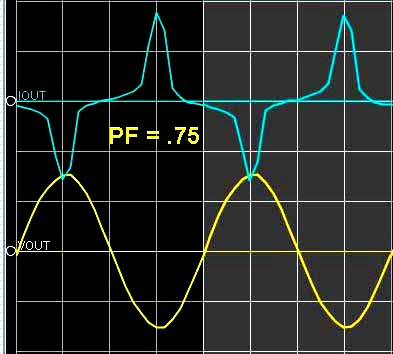
Sinusoidal voltage and non-sinusoidal current give a distortion power factor of 0.7 for a computer power supply load.

The result of mains rectifiers with connected large value smoothing capacitors is that mains current only flows in the peaks and valleys of the AC wave. Whereas a half cycle of the mains lasts for 10 ms, the mains current flows with large smoothing capacitors for only 3 ms. The result is that high peak currents flow during a short time. The power factor of such rectify and smooth apparatus may be as low as 0.6, and a large number of harmonics (3: 150 Hz), (5: 250 Hz) etc. are generated. This leads to much extra losses in the distribution network, especially in the neutral conductor of a 3 phase distribution network, since the 3rd harmonic of the R, S, and T phase are in phase with each other. The resulting neutral conductor can be larger than the current in each of the phases R, S and T. The sinusoidal wave that the mains voltage should be is distorted and resembled in the days before the harmonic current standard was applicable to electronic apparatus, more a trapezoidal wave: The tops and valleys of the sine wave were flattened.

IEC 61000-3-2 aims to set limits to the harmonic currents drawn by electrical apparatus and so maintain mains voltage quality. It is a compromise between cost and the performance of extra electronic front end circuits, the so called active power factor correcting circuits. With present day components with wide use, e.g. in fluorescent lighting ballasts, the cost is relatively low. Although these circuits use inductors, these are cheap, lightweight and small ferrite core components.

Background was given for a 50 Hz mains voltage. For 60 Hz the harmonic currents have other frequencies (3:180 Hz, 5: 300 Hz) and a half-wave lasts 8.33 ms, and a typical rectifier smoothing capacitor combination would conduct for only 2.5 ms during each half cycle (twice per mains wave, one time on the top and one time on the valley). Hum frequency is 120 Hz.

== Scope ==
International standard IEC 61000-3-2:2005+A1:2008+A2:2009 applied to equipment using voltage not less than 220 V and current up to and including 16 A per phase to limit the harmonic currents emission.

The equipment is divided into 5 groups: One group with excluded equipment, that needs no testing, and 4 groups A, B, C and D with different requirements as listed in the lower table.

Harmonic order	Limits class A (A)	Limits class B (A)	Limits class C. Harmonic current limit expressed as a percentage of the 50 Hz input current (%)	Class D Permissible harmonic current per Watt input power (mA/Watt) (*1)	Class D Permissible harmonic current (A) (*1)
2	1.08	1.62	2	–	–
3	2.30	3.45	30*λ (*2)	3.40	2.30
4	0.43	0.64			
5	1.14	1.71	10	1.90	1.14
6	0.30	0.45			
7	0.77	1.15	7	1	0.77
8	0.23	0.34			
9	0.40	0.60	5	0.50	0.40
10	0.18	0.27			
11	0.33	0.49	3	0.35	0.33
12	0.15	0.22			–
13	0.21	0.31	3	0.29	0.21
14	0.13	0.19	–	–	–
15	0.15	0.22	3	0.25	0.15
16	0.11	0.16	–	–	–
17	0.13	0.19	3	0.22	0.13
18	0.10	0.15	–	–	–
19	0.11	0.16	3	0.20	0.11
20	0.09	0.13	–	–	–
21	0.10	0.15	3	0.18	0.10
22	0.08	0.12	–	–	–
23	0.09	0.13	3	0.16	0.09
24	0.07	0.10	–	–	–
25	0.09	0.13	3	0.15	0.09
26	0.07	0.10	–	–	–
27	0.08	0.12	3	0.14	0.08
28	0.06	0.09	–	–	–
29	0.07	0.10	3	0.13	0.07
30	0.06	0.09	–	–	–
31	0.07	0.10	3	0.12	0.07
32	0.05	0.07	–	–	–
33	0.06	0.09	3	0.11	0.06
34	0.05	0.07	–	–	–
35	0.06	0.09	3	0.11	0.06
36	0.05	0.07	–	–	–
37	0.06	0.09	3	0.10	0.06
38	0.04	0.06	–	–	–
39	0.05	0.07	3	0.09	0.05
40	0.04	0.06	-	–	–

=== Harmonic current limits for class A, B, C and D ===
(*1) The lowest of these values applies (*2) λ is the power factor of the circuit under test.

== History ==
- 1st edition: IEC 61000-3-2:1995
- 2nd edition: IEC 61000-3-2:2000
- 3rd edition: IEC 61000-3-2:2005
- 4th edition: IEC 61000-3-2:2014
- 5th edition: IEC 61000-3-2:2018
