= Poste Adélard-Godbout =

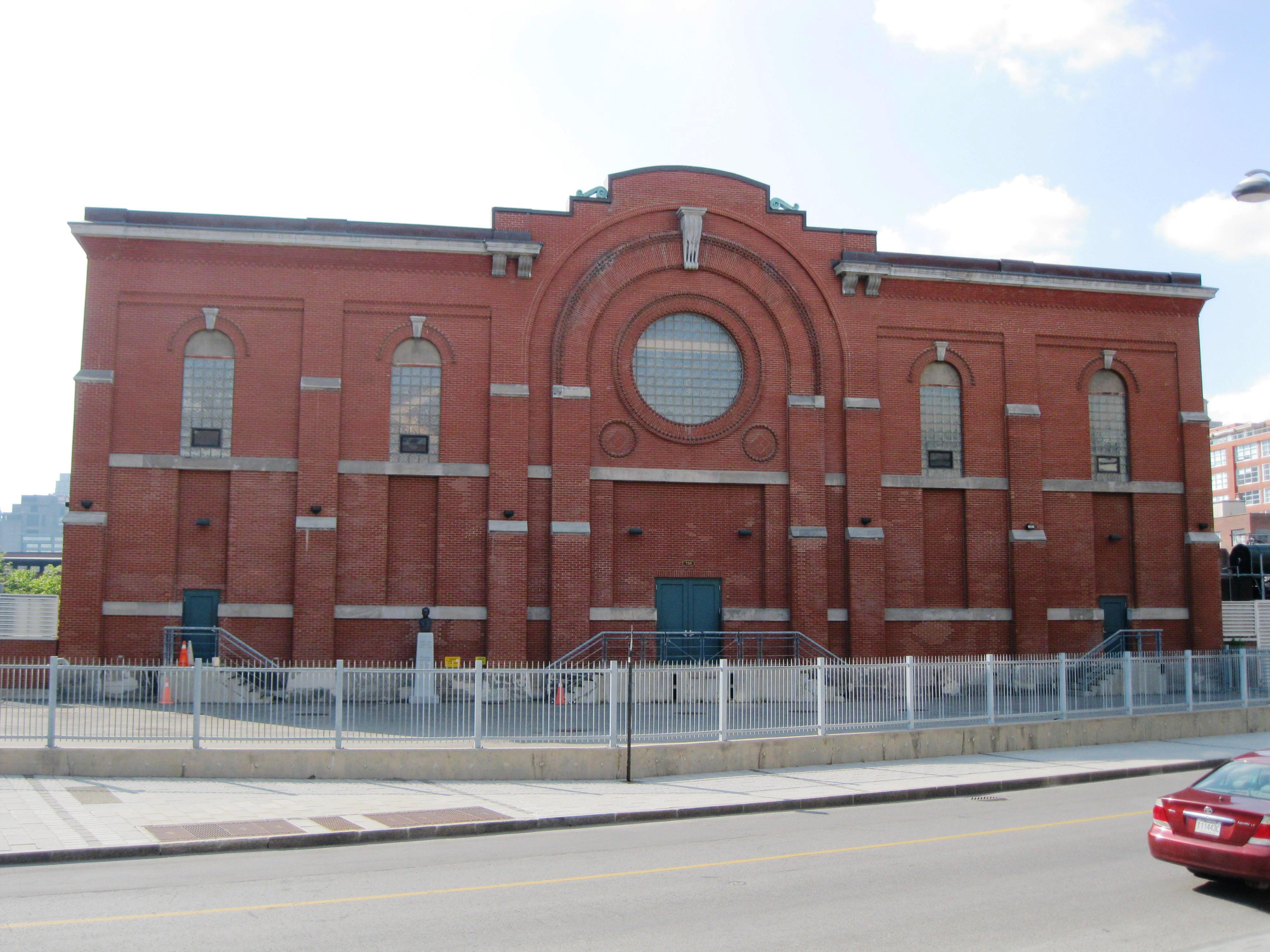
- Poste Adélard-Godbout in 2012

- Location within Montreal

General information
- Type: Electrical infrastructure
- Architectural style: Neo Classical
- Location: 733 Wellington Street, Montreal, Quebec, Canada
- Coordinates: 45.497528°N 73.556308°W
- Completed: 1904
- Owner: Hydro-Québec

The Poste Adélard-Godbout is a 120 kV electrical substation in Old Montreal. Canada's oldest substation, it has been in continuous operation since 1901. It contains two stories above ground and one below ground. It has a facade in clay brick with grey stone ornaments.

Designed by Maurice Perrault, it was built between 1901 and 1904. Initially it received 12 kV current from the now defunct Lachine hydroelectric generating station. Later it received 25 kV from a generating station in Chambly (demolished in 1964).

It was built by the Montreal Light, Heat & Power Company (MLHPC) and became the property of Hydro-Québec in 1944 during the nationalization of Quebec's electrical infrastructure.

Originally Poste Central-1, in 2007 it was renamed after former Premier of Quebec Adélard Godbout on the 50th anniversary of his death.
