= Power factor =

Ratio of active power to apparent power

In electrical engineering, the power factor of an AC power system is defined as the ratio of the real power absorbed by the load to the apparent power flowing in the circuit. Real power is the average of the instantaneous product of voltage and current and represents the capacity of the electricity for performing work. Apparent power is the product of root mean square (RMS) current and voltage. Apparent power is often higher than real power because energy is cyclically accumulated in the load and returned to the source or because a non-linear load distorts the wave shape of the current. Where apparent power exceeds real power, more current is flowing in the circuit than would be required to transfer real power. Where the power factor magnitude is less than one, the voltage and current are not in phase, which reduces the average product of the two. A negative power factor occurs when the device (normally the load) generates real power, which then flows back towards the source.

In an electric power system, a load with a low power factor draws more current than a load with a high power factor for the same amount of useful power transferred. The larger currents increase the energy lost in the distribution system and require larger wires and other equipment. Because of the costs of larger equipment and wasted energy, electrical utilities will usually charge a higher cost to industrial or commercial customers with a low power factor.

Power-factor correction (PFC) increases the power factor of a load, improving efficiency for the distribution system to which it is attached. Linear loads with a low power factor (such as induction motors) can be corrected with a passive network of capacitors or inductors. Non-linear loads, such as rectifiers, distort the current drawn from the system. In such cases, active or passive power factor correction may be used to counteract the distortion and raise the power factor. The devices for correction of the power factor may be at a central substation, spread out over a distribution system, or built into power-consuming equipment.

== General case ==
Schematic showing how power factor is calculated

The general expression for power factor is given by

$$\mbox{power factor} = P/P_a$$
$$P_a = I_{rms} V_{rms}$$

where $P$ is the real power measured by an ideal wattmeter, $I_{rms}$ is the rms current measured by an ideal ammeter, and $V_{rms}$ is the rms voltage measured by an ideal voltmeter. Apparent power, $P_a$, is the product of the rms current and the rms voltage.

If the load is sourcing power back toward the generator, then $P$ and $\mbox{power factor}$ will be negative.

If the waveforms are periodic with the same fundamental period, then the power factor can be computed as follows:
$$\begin{align} P &=\frac{1}{T}  \int_{t'}^{t'+T} i(t)v(t) dt,\\
I_{rms} &=\sqrt{\frac{1}{T} \int_{t'}^{t'+T} {i(t)}^2 dt},\\
V_{rms} &=\sqrt{\frac{1}{T} \int_{t'}^{t'+T} {v(t)}^2 dt},\\
\mbox{power factor} &= \frac{P}{I_{rms}V_{rms}},
\end{align}$$
where $i(t)$ is the instantaneous current, $v(t)$ is the instantaneous voltage, $t'$ is an arbitrary starting time, and $T$ is the period of the waveforms.

If the waveforms are not periodic and the physical meters have the same averaging time, then the equations for the periodic case can be used with the exception that $T$ is the averaging time of the meters instead of the waveform period.

== Linear circuits ==
Power flow calculated from AC voltage and current entering a load having a zero power factor (ϕ = 90°, cos(ϕ) = 0). The blue line shows the instantaneous power entering the load: all of the energy received during the first (or third) quarter cycle is returned to the grid during the second (or fourth) quarter cycle, resulting in an average power flow (light blue line) of zero.

Instantaneous and average power calculated from AC voltage and current for a load with a lagging power factor (ϕ = 45°, cos(ϕ) ≈ 0.71). The blue line (instantaneous power) shows that a portion of the energy received by the load is returned to the grid during the part of the cycle labeled ϕ.

In a linear circuit, consisting of combinations of resistors, inductors, and capacitors, current flow has a sinusoidal response to the sinusoidal line voltage. A linear load does not change the shape of the input waveform but may change the relative timing (phase) between voltage and current, due to its inductance or capacitance.

In a purely resistive AC circuit, voltage and current waveforms are in step (or in phase), changing polarity at the same instant in each cycle. All the power entering the load is consumed (or dissipated).

Where reactive loads are present, such as with capacitors or inductors, energy storage in the loads results in a phase difference between the current and voltage waveforms. During each cycle of the AC voltage, extra energy, in addition to any energy consumed in the load, is temporarily stored in the load in electric or magnetic fields then returned to the power grid a fraction of the period later.

Electrical circuits containing predominantly resistive loads (incandescent lamps, devices using heating elements like electric toasters and ovens) have a power factor of almost 1, but circuits containing inductive or capacitive loads (electric motors, solenoid valves, transformers, fluorescent lamp ballasts, and others) can have a power factor well below 1.

A circuit with a low power factor will use a greater amount of current to transfer a given quantity of real power than a circuit with a high power factor thus causing increased losses due to resistive heating in power lines, and requiring the use of higher-rated conductors and transformers.

=== Definition and calculation ===
AC power has two components:

- Real power or active power ($P$) (sometimes called average power), expressed in watts (W)
- Reactive power ($Q$), usually expressed in reactive volt-amperes (var)

Together, they form the complex power ($S$) expressed as volt-amperes (VA). The magnitude of the complex power is the apparent power ($|S|$), also expressed in volt-amperes (VA).

The VA and var are non-SI units dimensionally similar to the watt but are used in engineering practice instead of the watt to state what quantity is being expressed. The SI explicitly disallows using units for this purpose or as the only source of information about a physical quantity as used.

The power factor is defined as the ratio of real power to apparent power. As power is transferred along a transmission line, it does not consist purely of real power that can do work once transferred to the load, but rather consists of a combination of real and reactive power, called apparent power. The power factor describes the amount of real power transmitted along a transmission line relative to the total apparent power flowing in the line.

The power factor can also be computed as the cosine of the angle θ by which the current waveform lags or leads the voltage waveform.

==== Power triangle ====
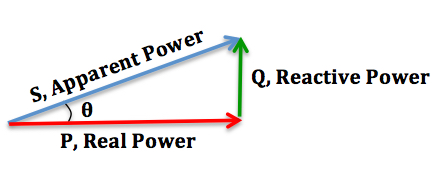

One can relate the various components of AC power by using the power triangle in vector space. Real power extends horizontally in the real axis and reactive power extends in the direction of the imaginary axis. Complex power (and its magnitude, apparent power) represents a combination of both real and reactive power, and therefore can be calculated by using the vector sum of these two components. We can conclude that the mathematical relationship between these components is:

$$\begin{align}
S &= P + jQ \\
|S| &= \sqrt{P^2 + Q^2} \\
\text{pf} &= \cos{\theta} = \frac{P}{|S|} = \cos{ \left( \arctan{ \left( \frac{Q}{P} \right) } \right) } \\
Q &= P \, \tan(\arccos(\text{pf}))
\end{align}$$

As the angle θ increases with fixed total apparent power, current and voltage are further out of phase with each other. Real power decreases, and reactive power increases.

==== Lagging, leading and unity power factors ====
Power factor is described as leading if the current waveform is advanced in phase concerning voltage, or lagging when the current waveform is behind the voltage waveform. A lagging power factor signifies that the load is inductive, as the load will consume reactive power. The reactive component $Q$ is positive as reactive power travels through the circuit and is consumed by the inductive load. A leading power factor signifies that the load is capacitive, as the load supplies reactive power, and therefore the reactive component $Q$ is negative as reactive power is being supplied to the circuit.

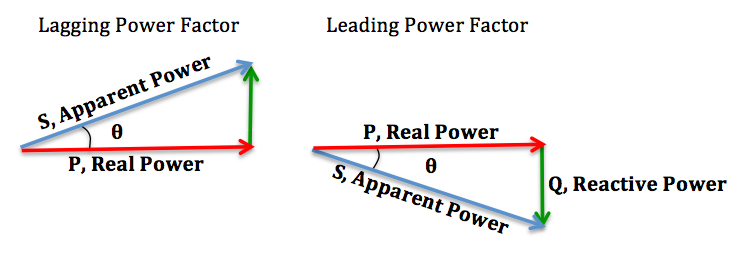

If θ is the phase angle between the current and voltage, then the power factor is equal to the cosine of the angle, $\cos\theta$:

$$|P| = |S| \cos\theta$$

Since the units are consistent, the power factor is by definition a dimensionless number between -1 and 1. When the power factor is equal to 0, the energy flow is entirely reactive, and stored energy in the load returns to the source on each cycle. When the power factor is 1, referred to as the unity power factor, all the energy supplied by the source is consumed by the load. Power factors are usually stated as leading or lagging to show the sign of the phase angle. Capacitive loads are leading (current leads voltage), and inductive loads are lagging (current lags voltage).

If a purely resistive load is connected to a power supply, current and voltage will change polarity in step, the power factor will be 1, and the electrical energy flows in a single direction across the network in each cycle. Inductive loads such as induction motors (any type of wound coil) consume reactive power with the current waveform lagging the voltage. Capacitive loads such as capacitor banks or buried cables generate reactive power with the current phase leading the voltage. Both types of loads will absorb energy during part of the AC cycle, which is stored in the device's magnetic or electric field, only to return this energy back to the source during the rest of the cycle.

For example, to get 1 kW of real power, if the power factor is unity, 1 kVA of apparent power needs to be transferred (1 kW ÷ 1 = 1 kVA). At low values of power factor, more apparent power needs to be transferred to get the same real power. To get 1 kW of real power at 0.2 power factor, 5 kVA of apparent power needs to be transferred (1 kW ÷ 0.2 = 5 kVA). This apparent power must be produced and transmitted to the load and is subject to losses in the production and transmission processes.

Electrical loads consuming alternating current power consume both real power and reactive power. The vector sum of real and reactive power is the complex power, and its magnitude is the apparent power. The presence of reactive power causes the real power to be less than the apparent power, and so, the electric load has a power factor of less than 1.

A negative power factor (0 to −1) can result from returning active power to the source, such as in the case of a building fitted with solar panels when surplus power is fed back into the supply.

=== Power factor correction of linear loads ===
Power factor correction of linear load

A high power factor is generally desirable in a power delivery system to reduce losses and improve voltage regulation at the load. Compensating elements near an electrical load will reduce the apparent power demand on the supply system. Power factor correction may be applied by an electric power transmission utility to improve the stability and efficiency of the network. Individual electrical customers who are charged by their utility for low power factor may install correction equipment to increase their power factor to reduce costs.

Power factor correction brings the power factor of an AC power circuit closer to 1 by supplying or absorbing reactive power, adding capacitors or inductors that act to cancel the inductive or capacitive effects of the load, respectively. In the case of offsetting the inductive effect of motor loads, capacitors can be locally connected. These capacitors help to generate reactive power to meet the demand of the inductive loads. This will keep that reactive power from having to flow from the utility generator to the load. In the electricity industry, inductors are said to consume reactive power, and capacitors are said to supply it, even though reactive power is just energy moving back and forth on each AC cycle.

The reactive elements in power factor correction devices can create voltage fluctuations and harmonic noise when switched on or off. They will supply or sink reactive power regardless of whether there is a corresponding load operating nearby, increasing the system's no-load losses. In the worst case, reactive elements can interact with the system and with each other to create resonant conditions, resulting in system instability and severe overvoltage fluctuations. As such, reactive elements cannot simply be applied without engineering analysis.

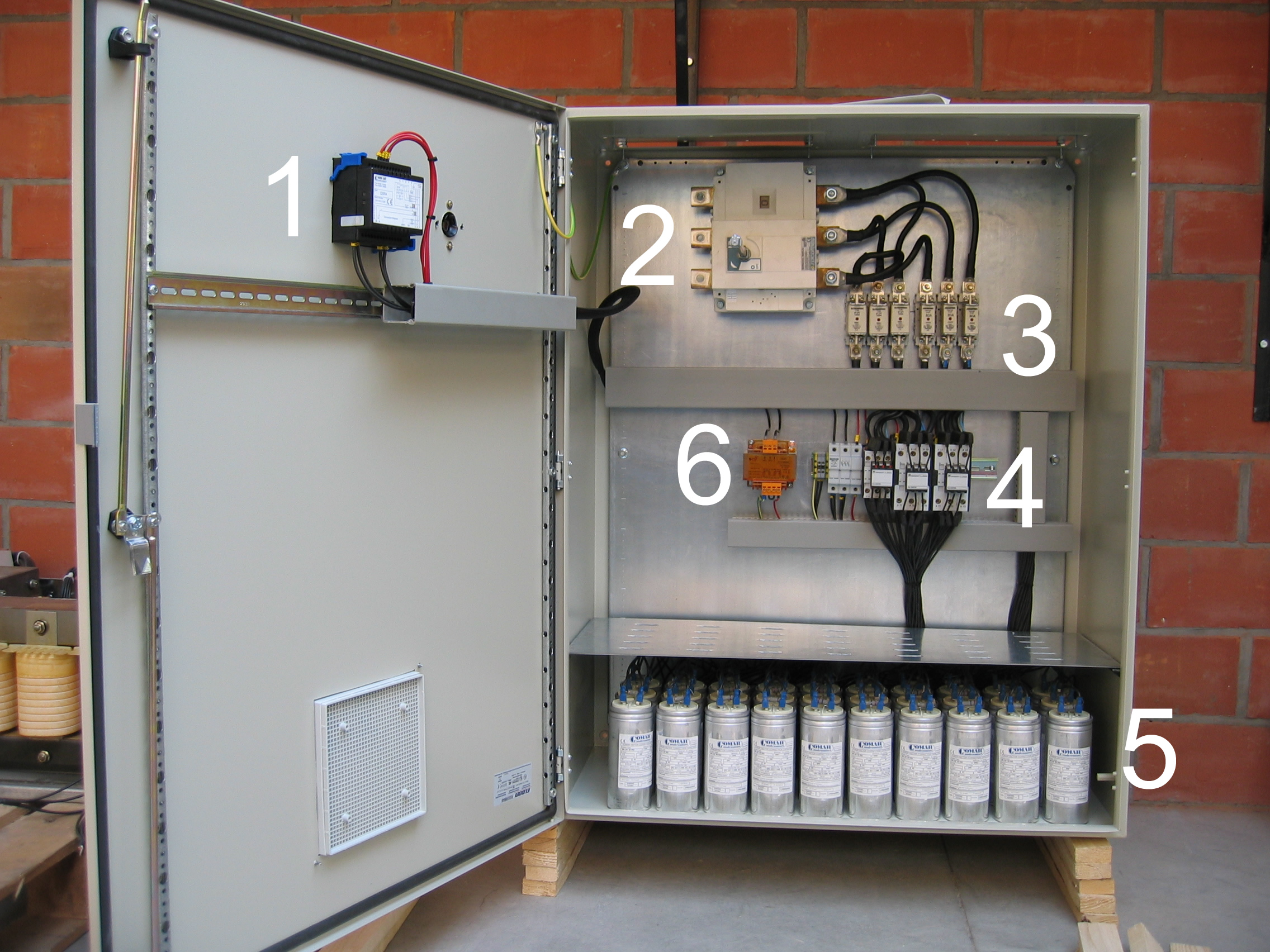
1. Reactive power control relay; 2. Network connection points; 3. Slow-blow fuses; 4. Inrush-limiting contactors; 5. Capacitors (single-phase or three-phase units, delta-connection); 6. Transformer (for controls and ventilation fans)

An automatic power factor correction unit consists of some capacitors that are switched by means of contactors. These contactors are controlled by a regulator that measures power factor in an electrical network. Depending on the load and power factor of the network, the power factor controller will switch the necessary blocks of capacitors in steps to make sure the power factor stays above a selected value.

In place of a set of switched capacitors, an unloaded synchronous motor can supply reactive power. The reactive power drawn by the synchronous motor is a function of its field excitation. It is referred to as a synchronous condenser. It is started and connected to the electrical network. It operates at a leading power factor and puts vars onto the network as required to support a system's voltage or to maintain the system power factor at a specified level.

The synchronous condenser's installation and operation are identical to those of large electric motors. Its principal advantage is the ease with which the amount of correction can be adjusted; it behaves like a variable capacitor. Unlike with capacitors, the amount of reactive power furnished is proportional to voltage, not the square of voltage; this improves voltage stability on large networks. Synchronous condensers are often used in connection with high-voltage direct-current transmission projects or in large industrial plants such as steel mills.

For power factor correction of high-voltage power systems or large, fluctuating industrial loads, power electronic devices such as the static VAR compensator or STATCOM are increasingly used. These systems are able to compensate sudden changes of power factor much more rapidly than contactor-switched capacitor banks and, being solid-state, require less maintenance than synchronous condensers.

== Non-linear loads ==
Examples of non-linear loads on a power system are rectifiers (such as used in a power supply), and arc discharge devices such as fluorescent lamps, electric welding machines, or arc furnaces. Because current in these systems is interrupted by a switching action, the current contains frequency components that are multiples of the power system frequency. Distortion power factor is a measure of how much the harmonic distortion of a load current decreases the average power transferred to the load.

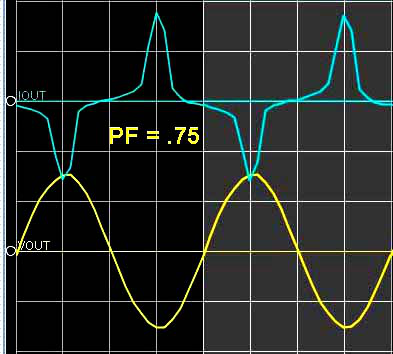
Sinusoidal voltage and non-sinusoidal current give a distortion power factor of 0.75 for this computer power supply load.

=== Non-sinusoidal components ===
In linear circuits having only sinusoidal currents and voltages of one frequency, the power factor arises only from the difference in phase between the current and voltage. This is displacement power factor.

Non-linear loads change the shape of the current waveform from a sine wave to some other form. Non-linear loads create harmonic currents in addition to the original (fundamental frequency) AC current. This is of importance in practical power systems that contain non-linear loads such as rectifiers, some forms of electric lighting, electric arc furnaces, welding equipment, switched-mode power supplies, variable speed drives and other devices. Filters consisting of linear capacitors and inductors can prevent harmonic currents from entering the supplying system.

To measure the real power or reactive power, a wattmeter designed to work properly with non-sinusoidal currents must be used.

=== Distortion power factor ===
The distortion power factor is the distortion component associated with the harmonic voltages and currents present in the system.

$$\begin{align}
\mbox{distortion power factor}
& = \frac{ I_1}{I_{rms}} \\
& = \frac{I_1} {\sqrt{I_1^2+I_2^2+I_3^2+I_4^2+\cdots}} \\
& = \frac{1} { \sqrt{1+ \frac{I_2^2+I_3^2+I_4^2+\cdots}{I_1^2}}} \\
& = \frac{1} {\sqrt{ 1+THD_i^2}} \\
\end{align}$$

$\mbox{THD}_i$ is the total harmonic distortion of the load current.

$$THD_i = \frac{\sqrt{\displaystyle\sum_{h=2}^\infty I_h^2}} {I_1}= \frac{\sqrt{I_2^2+I_3^2+I_4^2+\cdots}} {I_1}$$

$I_1$ is the fundamental component of the current, $I_{rms}$ is the total current, and $I_h$ is the current on the h^{th} harmonic; all are root mean square values (distortion power factor can also be used to describe individual order harmonics, using the corresponding current in place of total current). This definition with respect to total harmonic distortion assumes that the voltage stays undistorted (sinusoidal, without harmonics). This simplification is often a good approximation for stiff voltage sources (not being affected by changes in load downstream in the distribution network). Total harmonic distortion of typical generators from current distortion in the network is on the order of 1–2%, which can have larger scale implications but can be ignored in common practice.

The result when multiplied with the displacement power factor is the overall, true power factor or just power factor (PF):

$$\mbox{PF} = \frac{\cos{\varphi}} {\sqrt{ 1+THD_i^2}}$$

=== Distortion in three-phase networks ===
In practice, the local effects of distortion current on devices in a three-phase distribution network rely on the magnitude of certain order harmonics rather than the total harmonic distortion.

For example, the triplen, or zero-sequence, harmonics (3rd, 9th, 15th, etc.) have the property of being in-phase when compared line-to-line. In a delta-wye transformer, these harmonics can result in circulating currents in the delta windings and result in greater resistive heating. In a wye-configuration of a transformer, triplen harmonics will not create these currents, but they will result in a non-zero current in the neutral wire. This could overload the neutral wire in some cases and create error in kilowatt-hour metering systems and billing revenue. The presence of current harmonics in a transformer also result in larger eddy currents in the magnetic core of the transformer. Eddy current losses generally increase as the square of the frequency, lowering the transformer's efficiency, dissipating additional heat, and reducing its service life.

Negative-sequence harmonics (5th, 11th, 17th, etc.) combine 120 degrees out of phase, similarly to the fundamental harmonic but in a reversed sequence. In generators and motors, these currents produce magnetic fields which oppose the rotation of the shaft and sometimes result in damaging mechanical vibrations.

=== Correction of non-linear loads ===
The simplest way to control the harmonic current is to use a filter that passes current only at line frequency (50 or 60 Hz). The filter consists of capacitors or inductors and makes a non-linear device look more like a linear load. An example of passive PFC is a valley-fill circuit. A disadvantage of passive PFC is that it requires larger inductors or capacitors than an equivalent power active PFC circuit. Also, in practice, passive PFC is often less effective at improving the power factor.

Specifications taken from the packaging of a 610 W PC power supply showing active PFC rating

Active PFC is the use of power electronics to change the waveform of current drawn by a load to improve the power factor. Some types of the active PFC are buck, boost, buck–boost and synchronous condenser. Active power factor correction can be single-stage or multi-stage. In the case of a switched-mode power supply, a boost converter is inserted between the bridge rectifier and the main input capacitors. The boost converter attempts to maintain a constant voltage at its output while drawing a current that is always in phase with and at the same frequency as the line voltage. Another switched-mode converter inside the power supply produces the desired output voltage from the DC bus. This approach requires additional semiconductor switches and control electronics but permits cheaper and smaller passive components. It is frequently used in practice. For a three-phase SMPS, the Vienna rectifier configuration may be used to substantially improve the power factor. SMPSs with passive PFC can achieve power factor of about 0.7–0.75, SMPSs with active PFC, up to 0.99 power factor, while a SMPS without any power factor correction have a power factor of only about 0.55–0.65. Due to their very wide input voltage range, many power supplies with active PFC can automatically adjust to operate on AC power from about 100 V (Japan) to 240 V (Europe).

Dynamic power factor correction (DPFC), sometimes referred to as real-time power factor correction, is used for electrical stabilization in cases of rapid load changes (e.g. at large manufacturing sites). DPFC is useful when standard power factor correction would cause over or under correction. DPFC uses semiconductor switches, typically thyristors, to quickly connect and disconnect capacitors or inductors to improve power factor.

== Importance in distribution systems ==
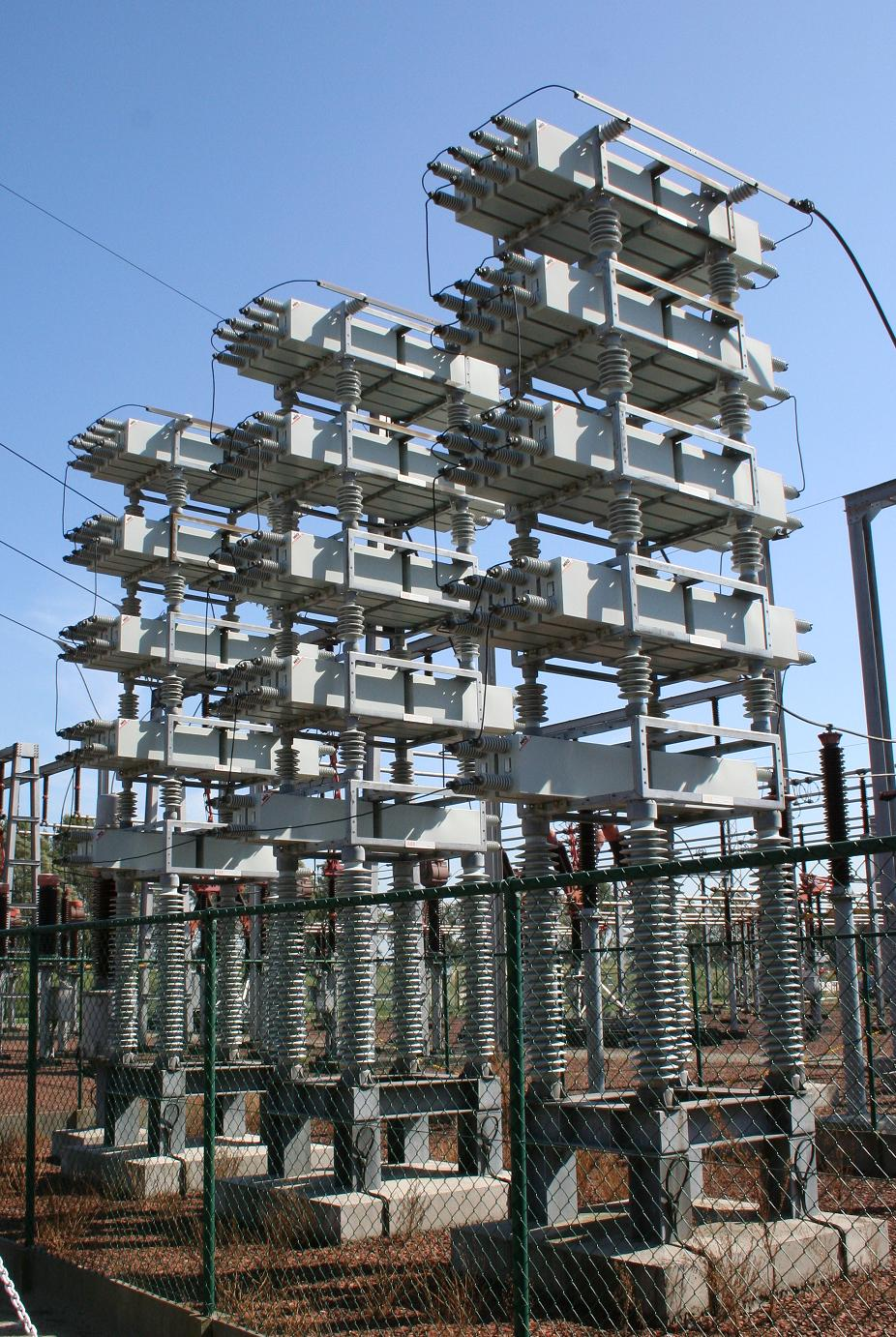
75 MVAr capacitor bank in a 150 kV substation in Belgium

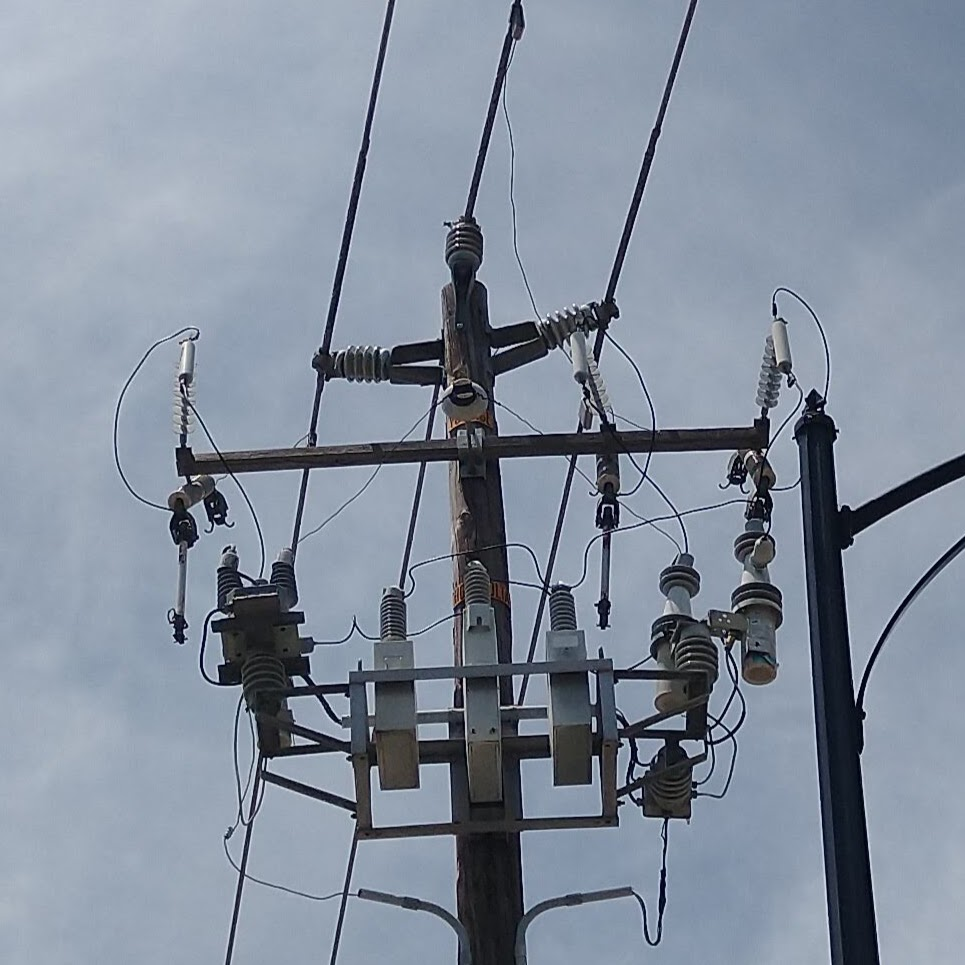
Capacitor bank, consisting of three rectangular capacitors shown in the middle, on a utility pole in San Jose, CA, USA

Power factors below 1.0 require a utility to generate more than the minimum volt-amperes necessary to supply the real power (watts). This increases generation and transmission costs. For example, if the load power factor were as low as 0.7, the apparent power would be 1.4 times the real power used by the load. Line current in the circuit would also be 1.4 times the current required at 1.0 power factor, so the losses in the circuit would be doubled (since they are proportional to the square of the current). Alternatively, all components of the system such as generators, conductors, transformers, and switchgear would be increased in size (and cost) to carry the extra current. When the power factor is close to unity, for the same kVA rating of the transformer more load current can be supplied.

Utilities typically charge additional costs to commercial customers who have a power factor below some limit, which is typically 0.9 to 0.95. Engineers are often interested in the power factor of a load as one of the factors that affect the efficiency of power transmission.

With the rising cost of energy and concerns over the efficient delivery of power, active PFC has become more common in consumer electronics. Current Energy Star guidelines for computers call for a power factor of ≥ 0.9 at 100% of rated output in the PC's power supply. According to a white paper authored by Intel and the U.S. Environmental Protection Agency, PCs with internal power supplies will require the use of active power factor correction to meet the ENERGY STAR 5.0 Program Requirements for Computers.

In Europe, EN 61000-3-2 requires power factor correction be incorporated into consumer products.

Small customers, such as households, are not usually charged for reactive power and so power factor metering equipment for such customers will not be installed.

== Measurement techniques ==
The power factor in a single-phase circuit (or balanced three-phase circuit) can be measured with the wattmeter-ammeter-voltmeter method, where the power in watts is divided by the product of measured voltage and current. The power factor of a balanced polyphase circuit is the same as that of any phase. The power factor of an unbalanced polyphase circuit is not uniquely defined.

A direct reading power factor meter can be made with a moving coil meter of the electrodynamic type, carrying two perpendicular coils on the moving part of the instrument. The field of the instrument is energized by the circuit current flow. The two moving coils, A and B, are connected in parallel with the circuit load. One coil, A, will be connected through a resistor and the second coil, B, through an inductor, so that the current in coil B is delayed with respect to current in A. At unity power factor, the current in A is in phase with the circuit current, and coil A provides maximum torque, driving the instrument pointer toward the 1.0 mark on the scale. At zero power factor, the current in coil B is in phase with circuit current, and coil B provides torque to drive the pointer towards 0. At intermediate values of power factor, the torques provided by the two coils add and the pointer takes up intermediate positions.

Another electromechanical instrument is the polarized-vane type. In this instrument a stationary field coil produces a rotating magnetic field, just like a polyphase motor. The field coils are connected either directly to polyphase voltage sources or to a phase-shifting reactor if a single-phase application. A second stationary field coil, perpendicular to the voltage coils, carries a current proportional to current in one phase of the circuit. The moving system of the instrument consists of two vanes that are magnetized by the current coil. In operation, the moving vanes take up a physical angle equivalent to the electrical angle between the voltage source and the current source. This type of instrument can be made to register for currents in both directions, giving a four-quadrant display of power factor or phase angle.

Digital instruments exist that directly measure the time lag between voltage and current waveforms. Low-cost instruments of this type measure the peak of the waveforms. More sophisticated versions measure the peak of the fundamental harmonic only, thus giving a more accurate reading for phase angle on distorted waveforms. Calculating power factor from voltage and current phases is only accurate if both waveforms are sinusoidal.

Power Quality Analyzers, often referred to as Power Analyzers, make a digital recording of the voltage and current waveform (typically either one phase or three phase) and accurately calculate true power (watts), apparent power (VA) power factor, AC voltage, AC current, DC voltage, DC current, frequency, IEC61000-3-2/3-12 Harmonic measurement, IEC61000-3-3/3-11 flicker measurement, individual phase voltages in delta applications where there is no neutral line, total harmonic distortion, phase and amplitude of individual voltage or current harmonics, etc.

== Mnemonics ==
Anglophone power engineering students are advised to remember: ELI the ICE man or ELI on ICE – the voltage E, leads the current I, in an inductor L. The current I leads the voltage E in a capacitor C.

Another common mnemonic is CIVIL – in a capacitor (C) the current (I) leads voltage (V), voltage (V) leads current (I) in an inductor (L).
