= Substation =

Part of an electrical transmission and distribution system

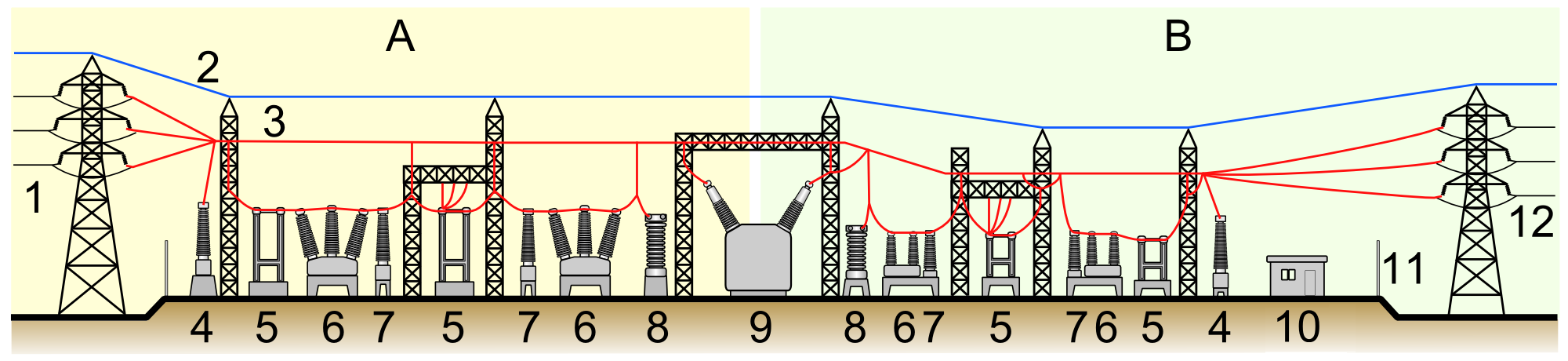
Elements of a substation: 1. Primary power lines' side; 2. Secondary power lines' side; 1. Primary power lines; 2. Ground wire; 3. Overhead lines; 4. Potential transformer; 5. Disconnect switch; 6. Circuit breaker; 7. Current transformer; 8. Lightning arrester; 9. Main transformer; 10. Control building; 11. Security fence; 12. Secondary power lines

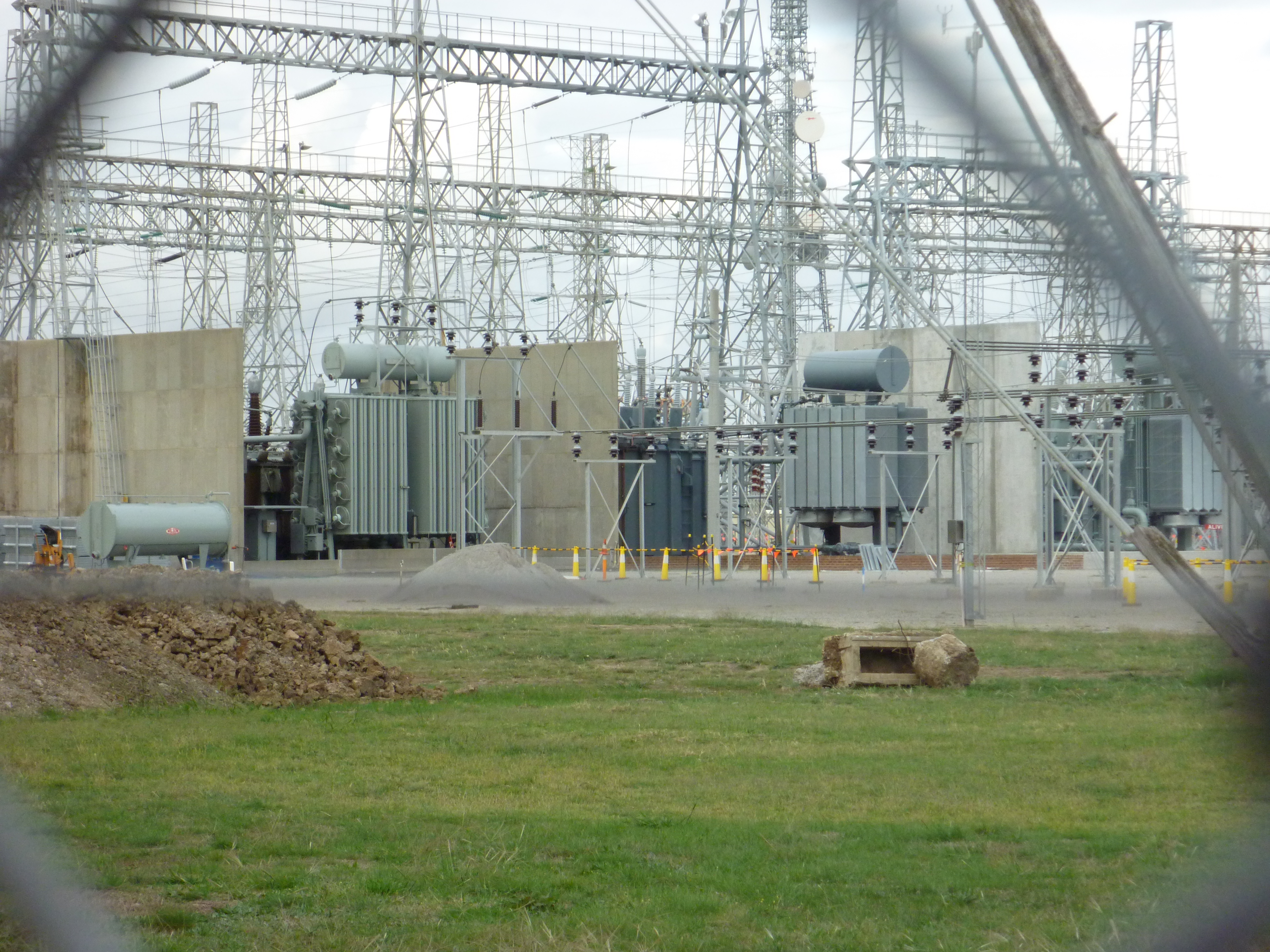
View of a 50 Hz electrical substation in Australia, showing three 220 kV/66 kV (150 kVA) transformers. Steel lattice structures support strain bus wires and apparatus, and transformer fire barriers prevent catastrophic failure of any one transformer from damaging adjacent units.

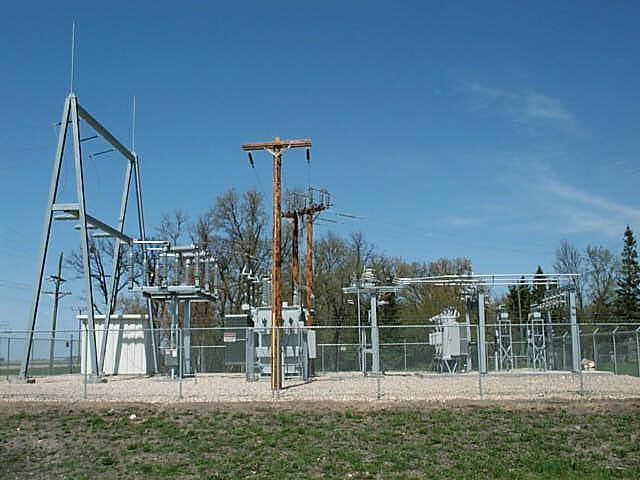
An American 115 kV to 41.6/12.47 kV 5 MVA 60 Hz substation with circuit switcher, regulators, reclosers and control building. It shows elements of low-profile construction, with apparatus mounted on individual columns.

A substation is a part of an electrical generation, transmission, and distribution system. Substations transform voltage from high to low, or the reverse, or perform any of several other important functions. Between the generating station and the consumer, electric power may flow through several substations at different voltage levels. A substation may include transformers to change voltage levels between high transmission voltages and lower distribution voltages, or at the interconnection of two different transmission voltages. They are a common component of the infrastructure. As of 2022, there were approximately 55,000 substations in the United States. Substations are also occasionally known in some countries as switchyards.

Substations may be owned and operated by an electrical utility, or may be owned by a large industrial or commercial customer. Generally substations are unattended, relying on SCADA for remote supervision and control.

The word substation comes from the days before the distribution system became a grid. As central generation stations became larger, smaller generating plants were converted to distribution stations, receiving their energy supply from a larger plant instead of using their own generators. The first substations were connected to only one power station, where the generators were housed, and were subsidiaries of that power station.

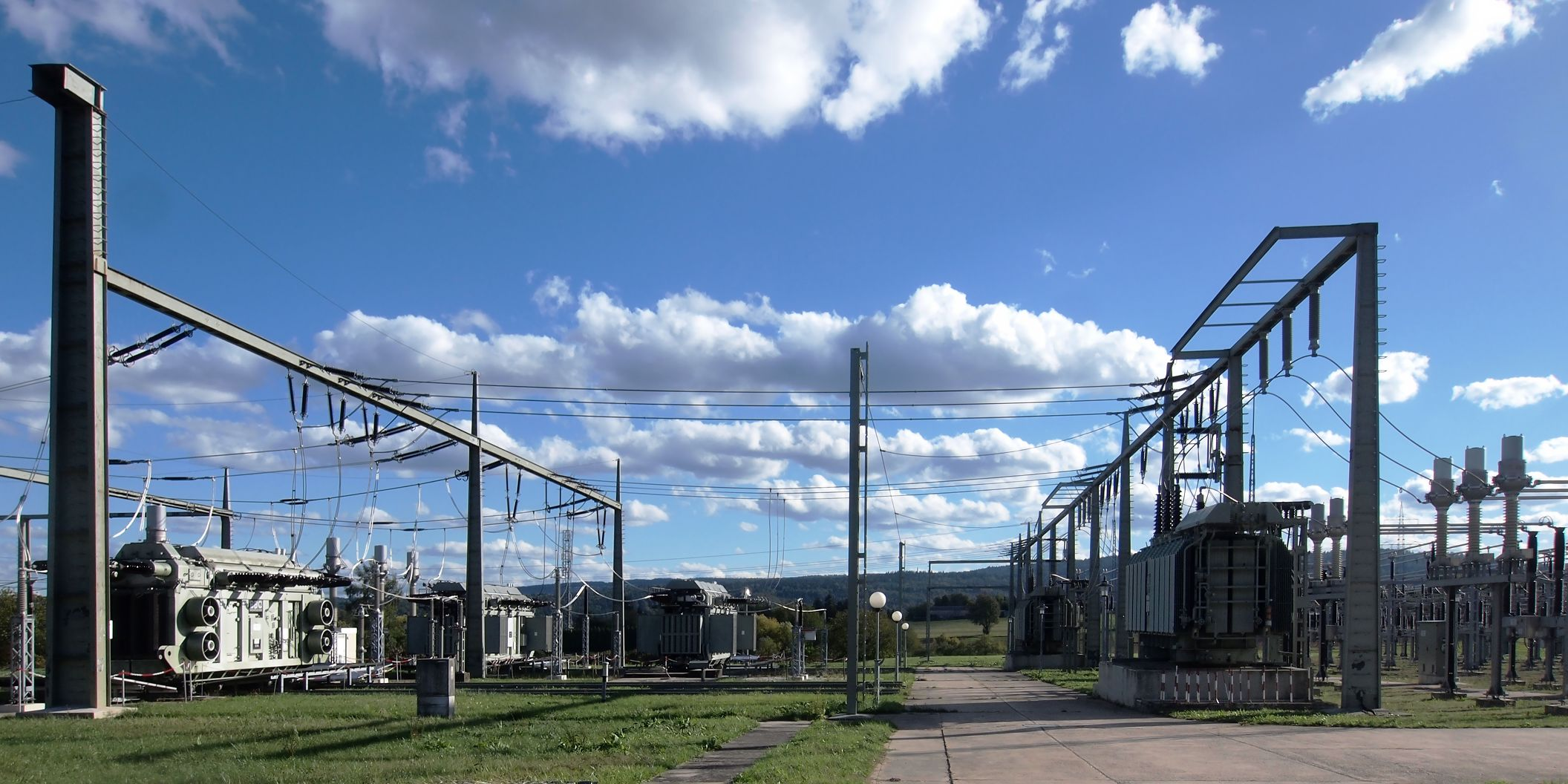
220 kV/110 kV/20 kV station in Germany

== Construction ==
Substations may be designed and built by a contractor or alternately all phases of its development may be handled by the electrical utility. Most commonly, the utility does the engineering and procurement while hiring a contractor for actual construction. Major design constraints for construction of substations include land availability and cost, limitations on the construction period, transportation restrictions, and the need to get the substation running quickly. Prefabrication is a common way to reduce the construction cost. For connecting the new substation, a partial outage at another substation may be required, but the utility often tries to minimize downtime.

== Types ==
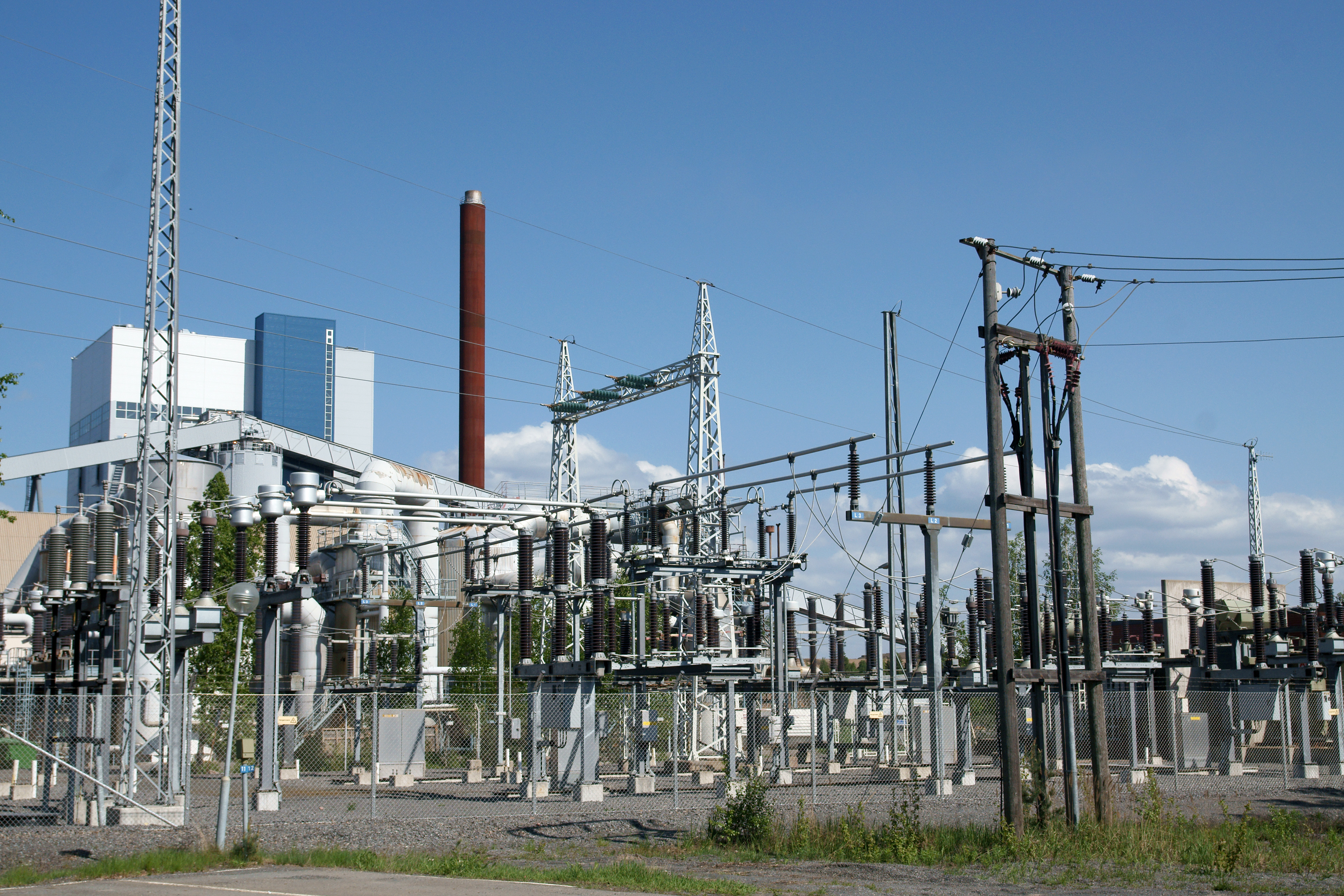
High-voltage substation in Kaanaa, Pori, Finland

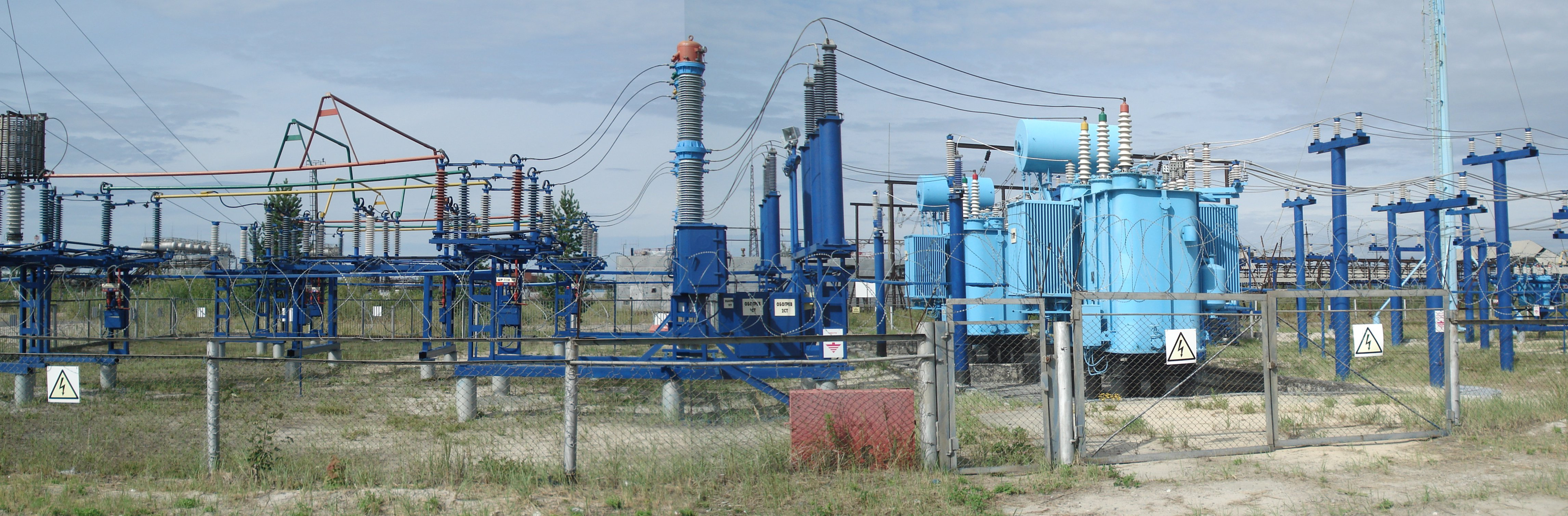
Substation in Russia

Substations typically serve at least one of the following purposes:

- Increasing the voltage produced by electric power generation for efficient transmission over long distances, using step-up transformers
- Interconnection of different power grids
- Reducing the voltage from transmission to lower-voltage distribution lines that supply individual homes or businesses
- Converting from alternating current (AC) to direct current (DC)

=== Transmission substation ===
A transmission substation connects two or more transmission lines. The simplest case is where all transmission lines have the same voltage. In such cases, the substation contains high-voltage switches that allow lines to be connected or isolated for fault clearance or maintenance. A transmission station may have transformers to convert between two transmission voltages, voltage control/power factor correction devices such as capacitors, reactors or static VAR compensators and equipment such as phase shifting transformers to control power flow between two adjacent power systems.

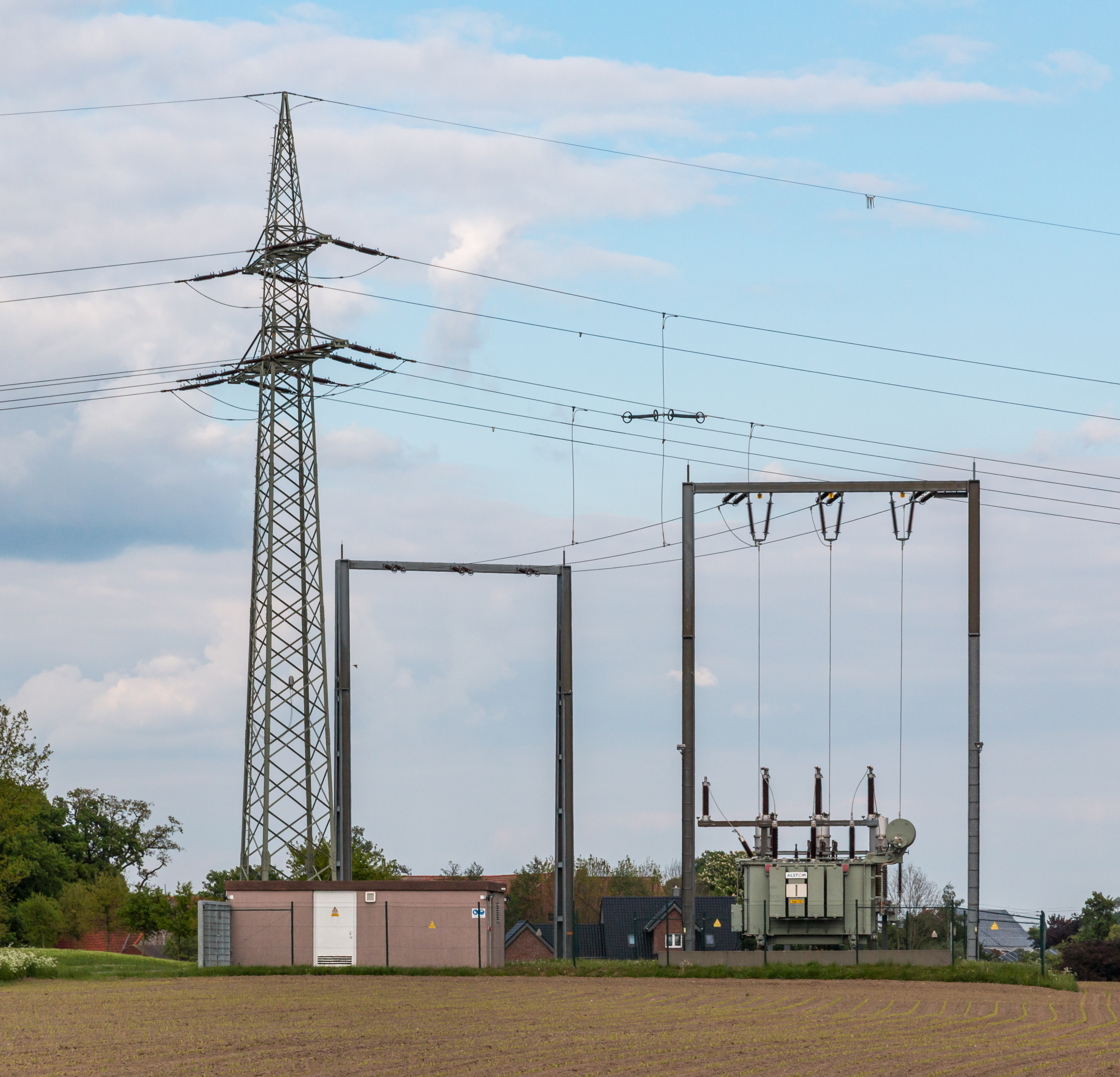
Minimal HV station in Germany

Transmission substations can range from simple to complex. A small "switching station" may be little more than a bus plus some circuit breakers. The largest transmission substations can cover a large area (several acres/hectares) with multiple voltage levels, many circuit breakers, and a large amount of protection and control equipment (voltage and current transformers, relays and SCADA systems). Modern substations may be implemented using international standards such as IEC Standard 61850.

=== Distribution substation ===
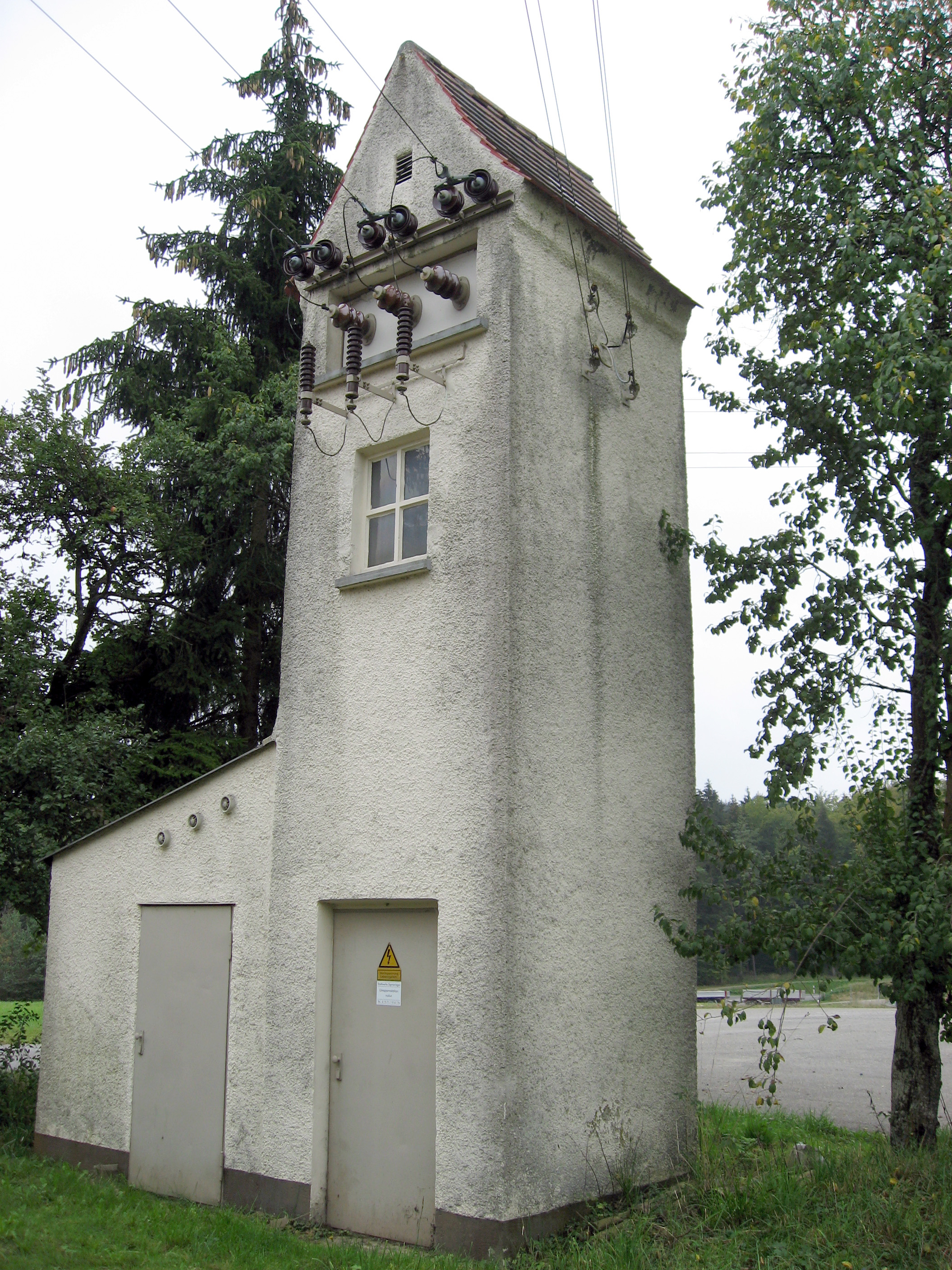
Transformer tower in Germany. Medium voltage supply at the front, low voltage output on the side.

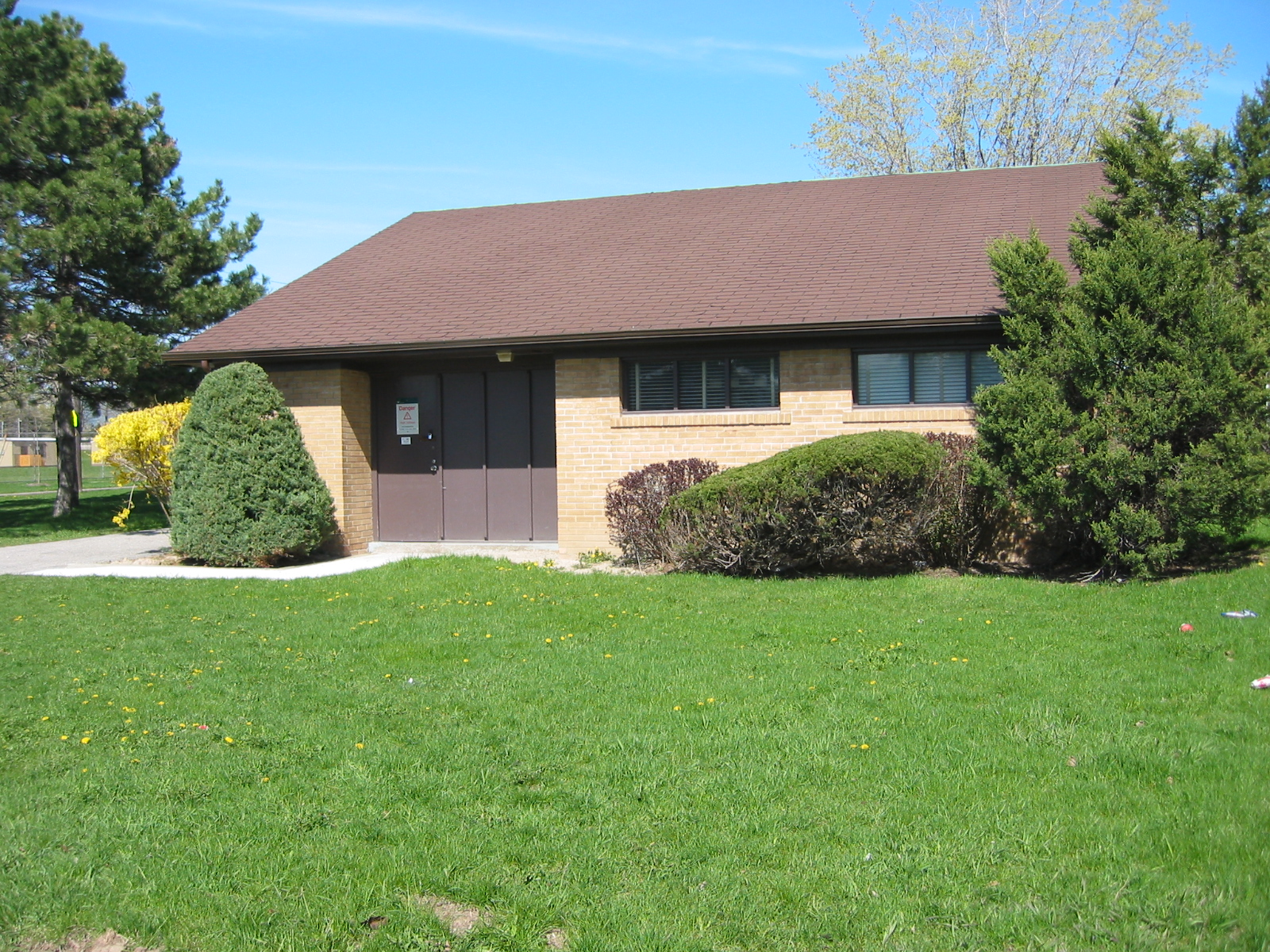
A distribution substation in Toronto, Canada, disguised as a house, complete with a driveway, front walk and a mown lawn and shrubs in the front yard. A warning notice can be clearly seen on the "front door". Disguises for substations are common in many cities.

A distribution substation transfers power from the transmission system to the distribution system of an area. It is uneconomical to directly connect electricity consumers to the main transmission network, unless they use large amounts of power, so the distribution station reduces voltage to a level suitable for local distribution.

The input for a distribution substation is typically at least two transmission or sub-transmission lines. Input voltage may be, for example, 115 kV, or whatever is common in the area. The output is a number of feeders. Distribution voltages are typically medium voltage, between 2.4 kV and 33 kV, depending on the size of the area served and the practices of the local utility. The feeders run along streets overhead (or underground, in some cases) and power the distribution transformers at or near the customer premises.

In addition to transforming voltage, distribution substations also isolate faults in either the transmission or distribution systems. Distribution substations are typically the points of voltage regulation, although on long distribution circuits (of several miles/kilometers), voltage regulation equipment may also be installed along the line.

The downtown areas of large cities feature complicated distribution substations, with high-voltage switching, and switching and backup systems on the low-voltage side. More typical distribution substations have a switch, one transformer, and minimal facilities on the low-voltage side.

=== Collector substation ===
In distributed generation projects such as a wind farm or photovoltaic power station, a collector substation may be required. It resembles a distribution substation although power flow is in the opposite direction, from many wind turbines or inverters up into the transmission grid. Usually for economy of construction the collector system operates around 35 kV, although some collector systems are 12 kV, and the collector substation steps up voltage to a transmission voltage for the grid. The collector substation can also provide power factor correction if it is needed, metering, and control of the wind farm. In some special cases a collector substation can also contain an HVDC converter station.

Collector substations also exist where multiple thermal or hydroelectric power plants of comparable output power are in proximity. Examples for such substations are Brauweiler in Germany and Hradec in the Czech Republic, where power is collected from nearby lignite-fired power plants. If no transformers are required for increasing the voltage to transmission level, the substation is a switching station.

=== Converter substations ===
Converter substations may be associated with HVDC converter plants, traction current, or interconnected non-synchronous networks. These stations contain power electronic devices to change the frequency of current, or else convert from alternating to direct current or the reverse. Formerly rotary converters changed frequency to interconnect two systems; nowadays such substations are rare.

=== Switching station ===
A switching station is a substation without transformers and operating only at a single voltage level. Switching stations are sometimes used as collector and distribution stations. Sometimes they are used for switching the current to back-up lines or for parallelizing circuits in case of failure. An example is the switching stations for the Inga–Shaba HVDC transmission line.

A switching station may also be known as a switchyard, and these are commonly located directly adjacent to or nearby a power station. In this case the generators from the power station supply their power into the yard onto the generator bus on one side of the yard, and the transmission lines take their power from a Feeder Bus on the other side of the yard.

An important function performed by a substation is switching, which is the connecting and disconnecting of transmission lines or other components to and from the system. Switching events may be planned or unplanned. A transmission line or other component may need to be de-energized for maintenance or for new construction, for example, adding or removing a transmission line or a transformer. To maintain reliability of supply, companies aim at keeping the system up and running while performing maintenance. All work to be performed, from routine testing to adding entirely new substations, should be done while keeping the whole system running.

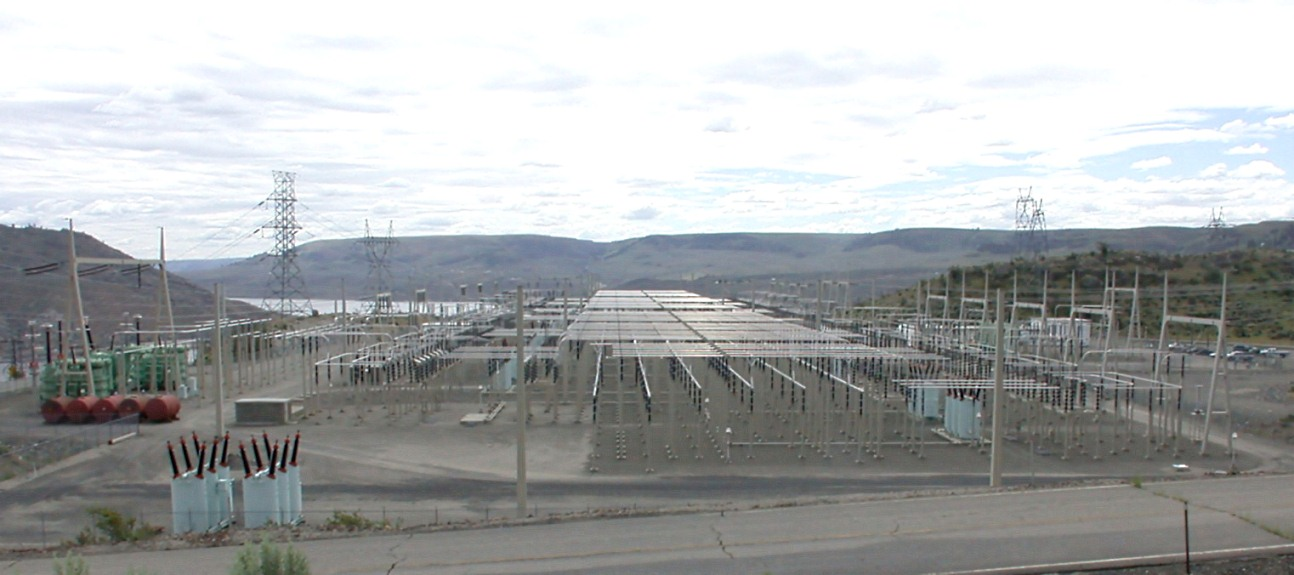
Switchyard at Grand Coulee Dam, United States, 2006. This is a 500 kV switchyard.

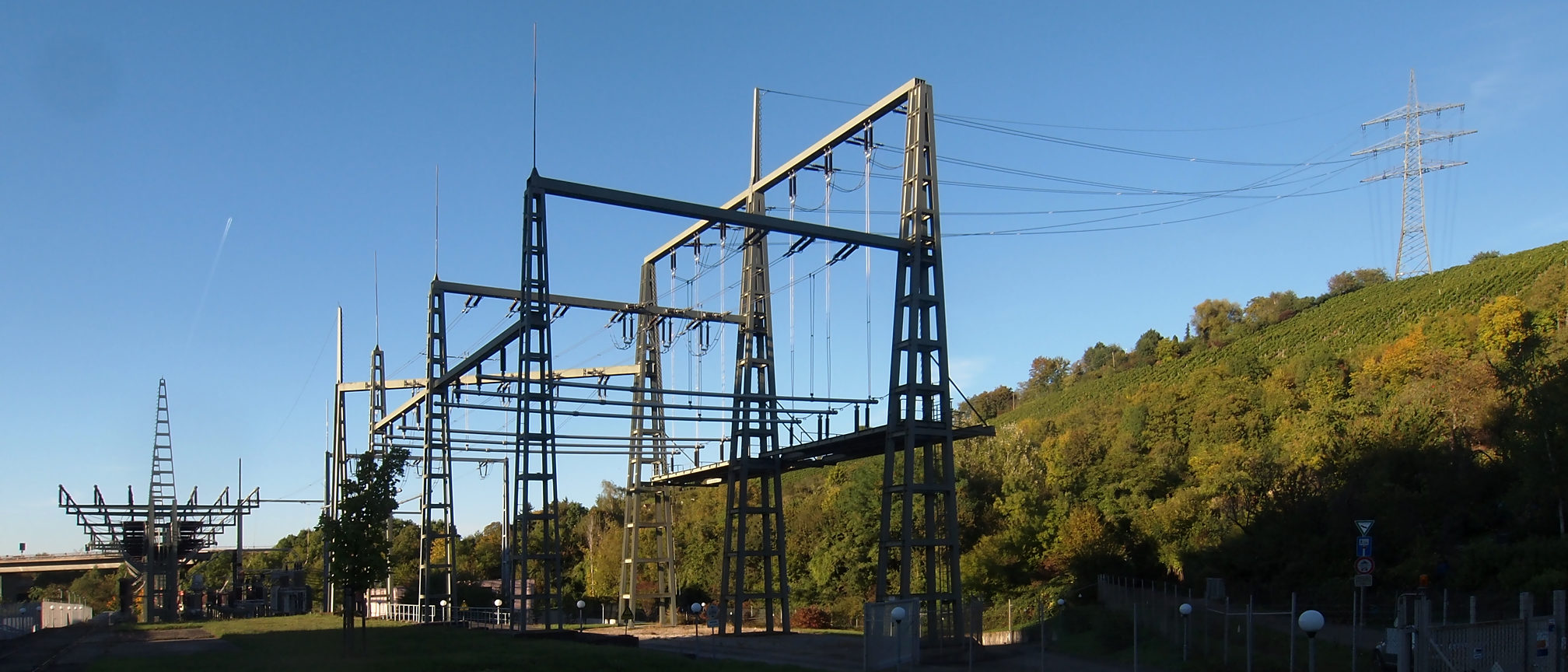
Former high-voltage substation in Stuttgart, Germany, now 110 kV switching station. The 220 kV level is eliminated for grid simplification.

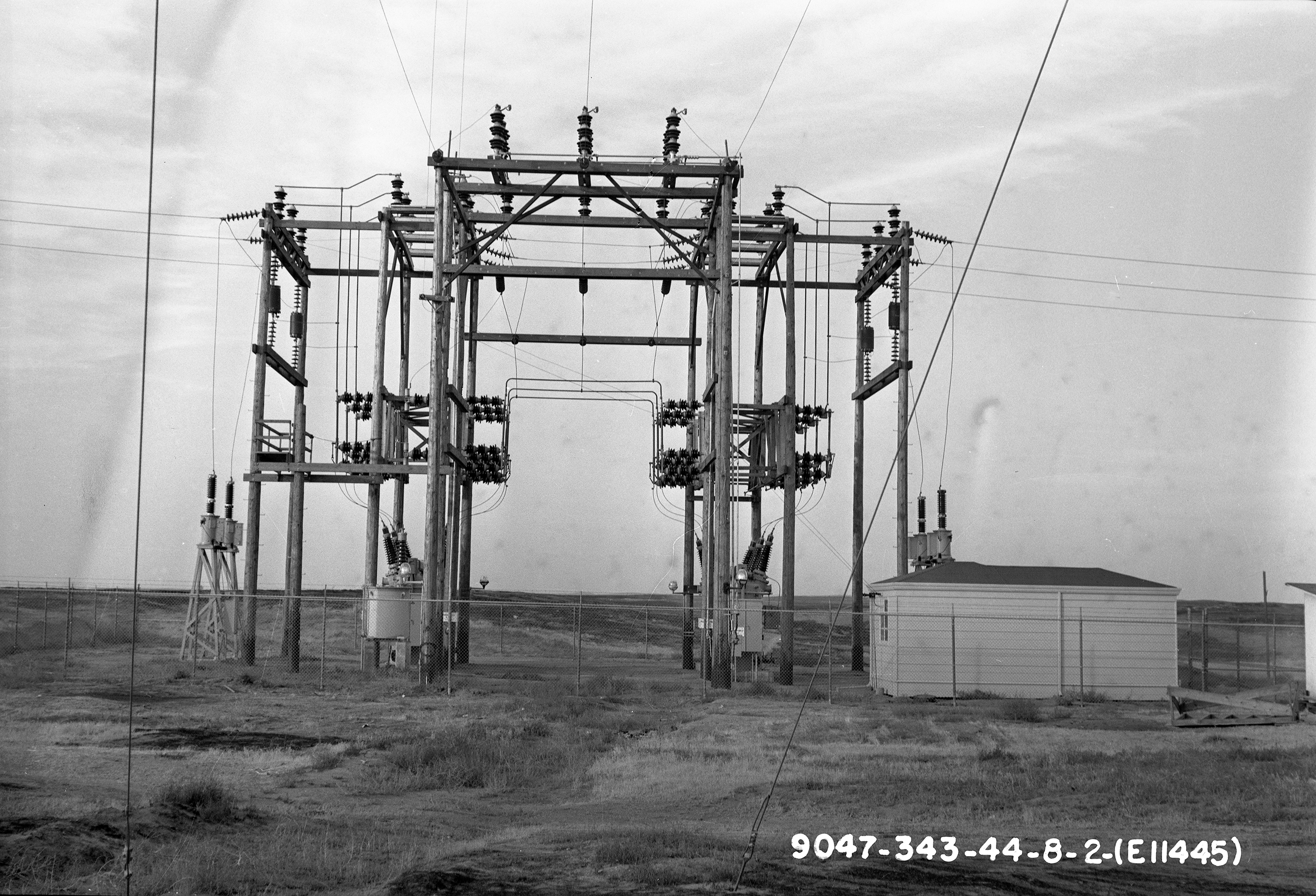
230 kV High-voltage switching station in Washington, United States

Unplanned switching events are caused by a fault in a transmission line or any other component, for example:

- a line is hit by lightning and develops an arc,
- a tower is blown down by high wind.

The function of the switching station is to isolate the faulty portion of the system in the shortest possible time. De-energizing faulty equipment protects it from further damage, and isolating a fault helps keep the rest of the electrical grid operating with stability.

=== Railways ===
Electrified railways also use substations, often distribution substations. In some cases a conversion of the current type takes place, commonly with rectifiers for direct current (DC) trains, or rotary converters for trains using alternating current (AC) at frequencies other than that of the public grid. Sometimes they are also transmission substations or collector substations if the railway network also operates its own grid and generators to supply the other stations.

=== Mobile substation ===
A mobile substation is a substation on wheels, containing a transformer, breakers and buswork mounted on a self-contained semi-trailer, meant to be pulled by a truck. They are designed to be compact for travel on public roads, and are used for temporary backup in times of natural disaster or war. Mobile substations are usually rated much lower than permanent installations, and may be built in several units to meet road travel limitations.

== Design ==
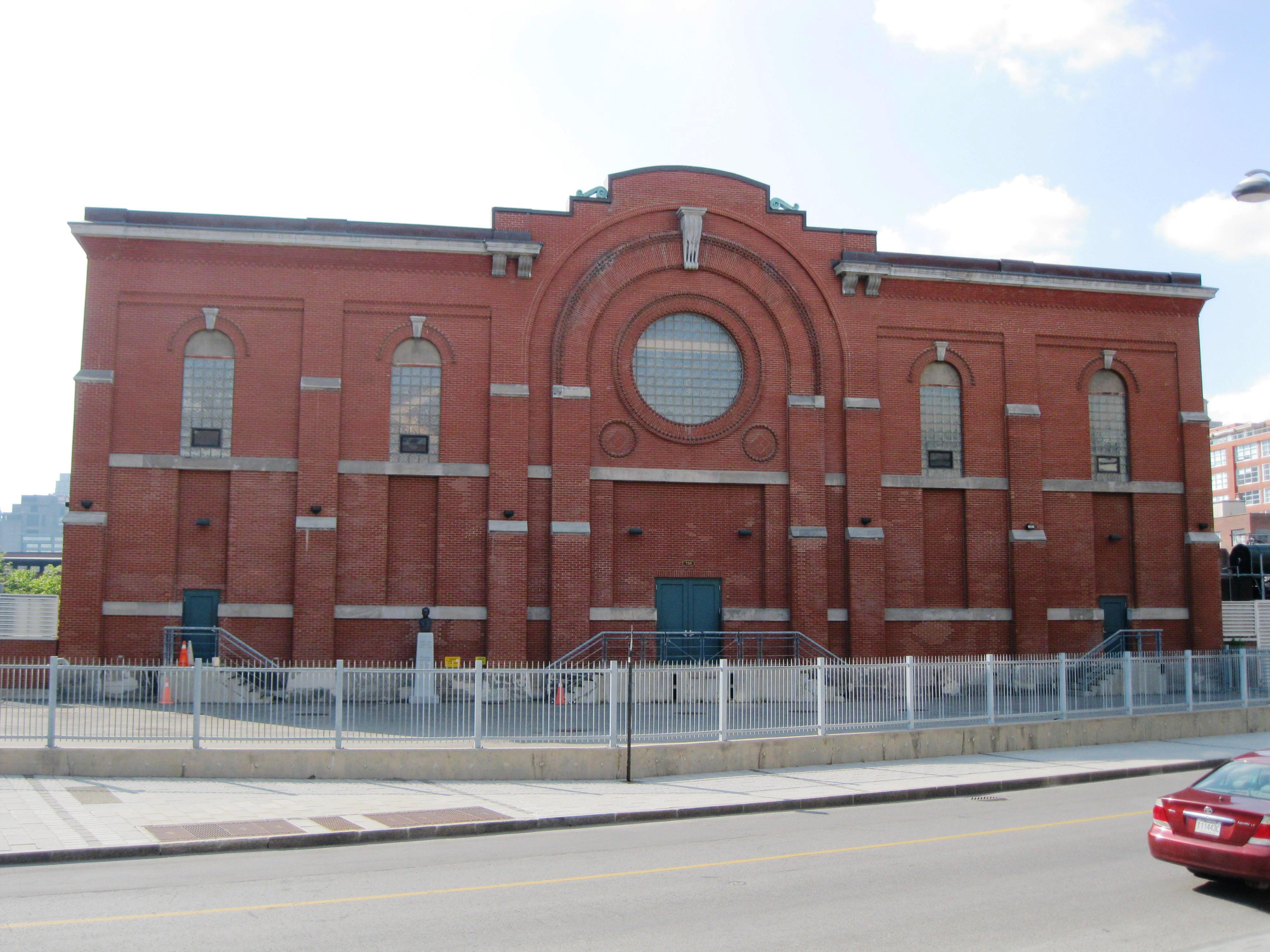
In continuous operation since 1901, the Adélard-Godbout substation in Old Montreal is Canada's oldest substation. It has a facade in clay brick with gray stone ornaments to blend in to its downtown environment.

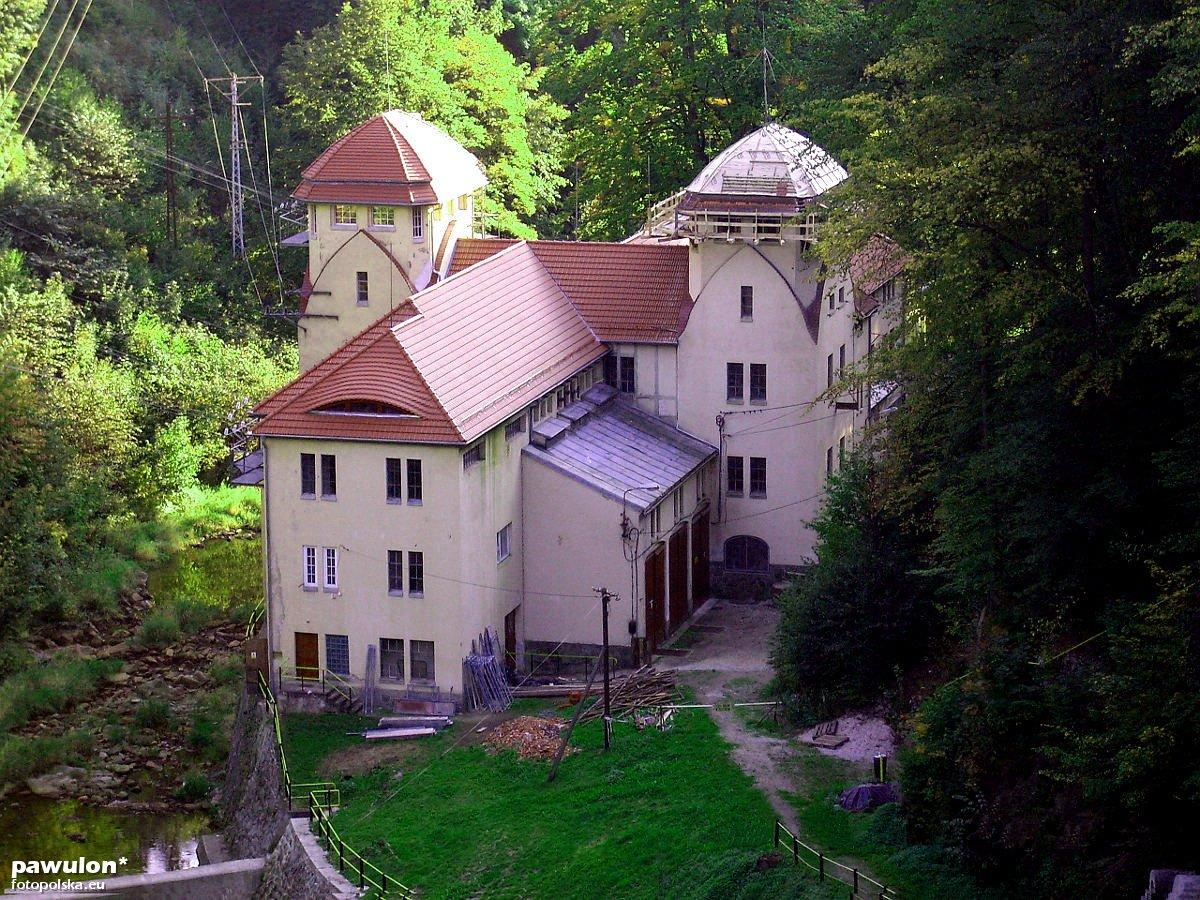
Substation in a castle-like building from the 1910s serves as distribution point next to the Leśna dam. It is one of several hydroelectric stations at the Bóbr river.

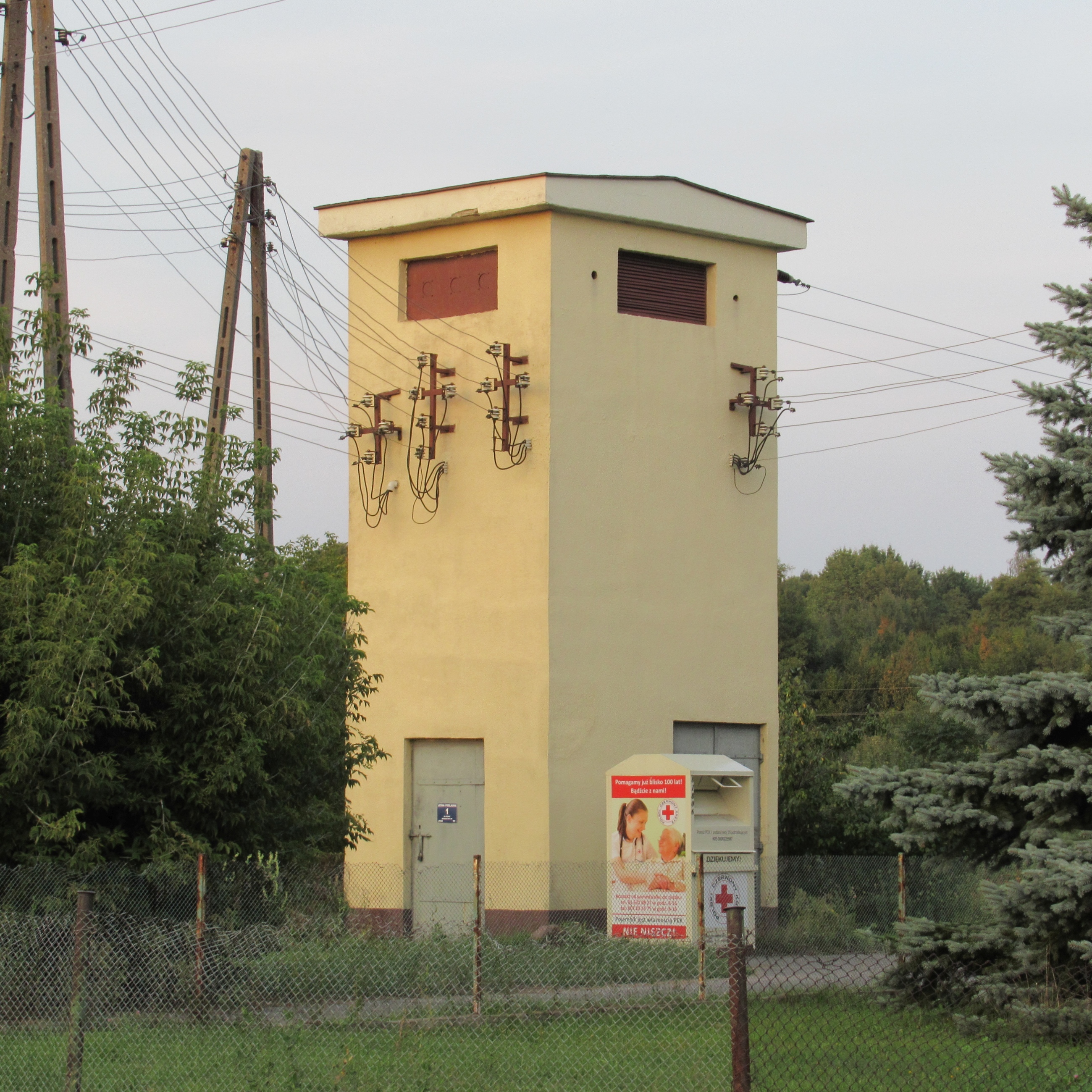
15 kV/400 V distribution tower in Poland

Substation design is aimed at minimizing cost while ensuring power availability and reliability, and enabling changes to the substation in the future.

Substations may be built outdoors, indoors, or underground or in a combination of these locations.

=== Location selection ===
Substations on the United States grid

Selection of the location of a substation must consider many factors. Sufficient land area is required for installation of equipment with necessary clearances for electrical safety, and for access to maintain large apparatus such as transformers. The site must have room for expansion due to load growth or planned transmission additions. Environmental effects of the substation must be considered, such as drainage, noise and road traffic effects.

The substation site must be reasonably central to the distribution area to be served. The site must be secure from intrusion by passers-by, both to protect people from injury by electric shock or arcs, and to protect the electrical system from misoperation due to vandalism.

If not owned and operated by a utility company, substations are typically occupied on a long lease such as a renewable 99-year lease, giving the utility company security of tenure.

=== Design diagrams ===
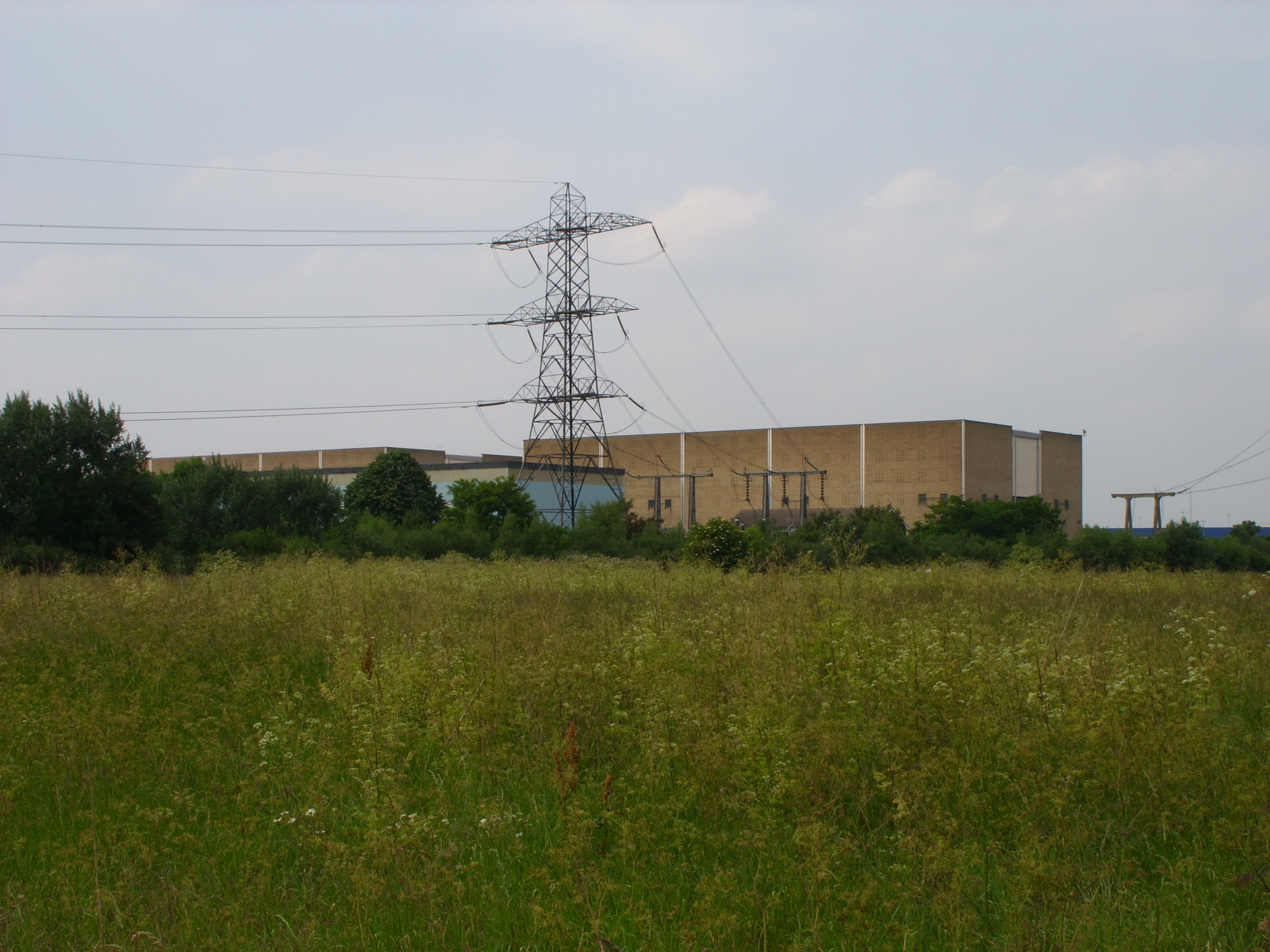
Tottenham Substation, set in wild parkland in North London.

The first step in planning a substation layout is the preparation of a single-line diagram, which shows in simplified form the switching and protection arrangement required, as well as the incoming supply lines and outgoing feeders or transmission lines. It is a usual practice by many electrical utilities to prepare one-line diagrams with principal elements (lines, switches, circuit breakers, transformers) arranged on the page similarly to the way the apparatus would be laid out in the actual station.

In a common design, incoming lines have a disconnector and a circuit breaker. In some cases, the lines will not have both, with either a switch or a circuit breaker being all that is considered necessary. A disconnect switch is used to provide isolation, since it cannot interrupt load current. A circuit breaker is used as a protection device to interrupt fault currents automatically, and may be used to switch loads on and off, or to cut off a line when power is flowing in the 'wrong' direction. When a large fault current flows through the circuit breaker, this is detected through the use of current transformers. The magnitude of the current transformer outputs may be used to trip the circuit breaker resulting in a disconnection of the load supplied by the circuit break from the feeding point. This seeks to isolate the fault point from the rest of the system, and allow the rest of the system to continue operating with minimal impact. Both switches and circuit breakers may be operated locally (within the substation) or remotely from a supervisory control center.

With overhead transmission lines, the propagation of lightning and switching surges can cause insulation failures into substation equipment. Line entrance surge arrestors are used to protect substation equipment accordingly. Insulation Coordination studies are carried out extensively to ensure equipment failure (and associated outages) is minimal.

Once past the switching components, the lines of a given voltage connect to one or more buses. These are sets of busbars, usually in multiples of three, since three-phase electrical power distribution is largely universal around the world.

The arrangement of switches, circuit breakers, and buses used affects the cost and reliability of the substation. For important substations a ring bus, double bus, or so-called "breaker and a half" setup can be used, so that the failure of any one circuit breaker does not interrupt power to other circuits, and so that parts of the substation may be de-energized for maintenance and repairs. Substations feeding only a single industrial load may have minimal switching provisions, especially for small installations.

This single-line diagram illustrates the breaker-and-a-half configuration often used in switchyards of small utilities. In large utilities the double-bus-double-breaker configuration is often preferred.

=== Safety ===
A warning sign commonly used at substations in the United Kingdom, warning of the danger of lethal electric shock

Because of the risk of electrical shock, substations are inherently dangerous to electrical workers. To mitigate this hazard, substations are designed with various safety features. Live conductors and bare equipment are kept separate, either with protected equipment, or using screens or distance. Based on the jurisdiction or company, there are safety standards with minimum required clearance between different live equipment or conductors or between live metal and the ground, which often varies with higher clearance being required for higher voltages because of the greater ability to generate flashover. To this is added the necessary space for employees to work safely and vehicles to pass. Sometimes it is necessary to work on parts of the substation while energized, but employees must maintain a safe distance of at least 3 metres (9.8 ft). The aim to reduce substation footprints comes into conflict with ease of maintenance enhanced by including gaps where employees can safely work.

Underneath a substation, a mat or grid of conductors laid around 0.5 or 0.6 metres (1 ft 8 in or 2 ft 0 in) underground provides grounding. This grid, which is typically copper although it may be galvanized iron in some countries, is used to ground circuits that are being worked on to prevent accidental re-energization while workers are in contact with a de-energized circuit. Often, earth rods are driven deeper into the ground from the grounding grid for lower resistance grounding, and may be surrounded by bentonite or marconite to further reduce resistance and ensure effective grounding for the lifetime of the substation. Above ground, the grounding conductors may be steel, aluminum, or copper. They must be thick enough to carry the expected current of a fault for 1–3 seconds and remain undamaged. Substation fences, typically at least 2 metres (6 ft 7 in) in height, both protect the public from electrical hazards and also protect the substation from vandalism. Internal fences can also be incorporated to protect employees from areas that are unsafe when energized.

== Components ==
Substations generally have switching, protection and control equipment, and transformers. In a large substation, circuit breakers are used to interrupt any short circuits or overload currents that may occur on the network. Smaller distribution stations may use recloser circuit breakers or fuses for protection of distribution circuits. Substations themselves do not usually have generators, although a power plant may have a substation nearby. Other devices such as capacitors, voltage regulators, and reactors may also be located at a substation.

Substations may be on the surface in fenced enclosures, underground, or special-purpose buildings. High-rise buildings may have several indoor substations. Indoor substations are usually found in urban areas to reduce the noise from transformers, improve appearance, or protect switchgear from extreme climate or pollution.

Substations often use busbars as conductors between electrical equipment. Busbars may be aluminum tubing 3–6 inches (76–152 mm) thick, or else wires (strain bus).

Outdoor, above-ground substation structures include wood pole, lattice metal tower, and tubular metal structures, although other variants are available. Where space is plentiful and appearance of the station is not a factor, steel lattice towers provide low-cost supports for transmission lines and apparatus. Low-profile substations may be specified in suburban areas where appearance is more critical. Indoor substations may be gas insulated substations (GIS) (at high voltages, with gas insulated switchgear), or use metal-enclosed or metal-clad switchgear at lower voltages. Urban and suburban indoor substations may be finished on the outside so as to blend in with other buildings in the area.

A compact substation is generally an outdoor substation built in a metal enclosure, in which each item of the electrical equipment is located very near to each other to create a relatively smaller footprint size of the substation.

=== Switchgear ===
High-voltage circuit breakers are commonly used to interrupt the flow of current in substation equipment. At the time of interruption, current could be normal, too high due to excessive load, unusual due to a fault, or tripped by protective relays prior to anticipated trouble. The most common technologies to extinguish the power arc from separating the conductors in the breaker include:

- Air at atmospheric pressure (air-insulated switchgear (AIS)), which is the most common worldwide. Air is the cheapest insulator and is easy to modify, but AIS takes up more space, and leaves equipment exposed to the outside environment. One drawback of AIS is the visual impact of a larger substation with overhead power lines entering and exiting, which may be unacceptable in scenic or urban areas. AIS requires additional bracing in a seismically active area, and emits more electromagnetic fields and noise than alternative technologies.
- Gas (gas circuit breaker (GCB) or gas-insulated switchgear (GIS)), most commonly sulfur hexafluoride (SF_{6}) or a mixture of gases including SF_{6}. Although it is the most expensive, these gases are a much more effective insulator than air. GIS require only 10 to 20 percent of the land area as AIS, which can save on land acquisition cost in urban areas, and allow the substation to be built at the exact location where its power is being used in an industrial or urban area—which can be a significant cost saving. On the generation side, GIS can be installed closer to the generator which allows cost savings in cabling, bus duct connections, and civil construction and can increase reliability. GIS can replace AIS if power requirements increase without requiring additional land area. Additionally, GIS is commonly installed in an enclosed building that keeps the equipment protected from pollution and salt. Unless the substation is often used for switching, maintenance cost can be very low or even zero for many years. Because SF_{6} turns to solid around −40 °C (−40 °F), in some climates these circuit breakers require heaters to function in extremely cold weather. SF_{6} has been used in switchgear since the 1960s.
- Mineral oil (called OCB for oil circuit breaker) provides a high resistance between the opened contacts, effectively stopping the flow of current. Although oil circuit breakers are suitable for a wide range of voltages, the oil becomes contaminated during the suppression of arcs and must be filtered or replaced periodically.
- Vacuum is a better insulator than air but less than gas or oil. Vacuum circuit breakers (VCB) are smaller than air circuit breakers and are commonly used in distribution and other switchgear under 35 kV.
- Mixed, including both gas and air insulation. Although it's the least common option it can be useful when an air-insulated substation needs to be expanded but there is very limited location for additional construction.

Reclosers are similar to breakers, and can be cheaper because they do not require separate protective relays. Often used in distribution, they often are programmed to trip when the amps exceed a certain amount over a period of time. Reclosers will attempt to re-energize the circuit after a delay. If unsuccessful for a few times, the recloser will have to be manually reset by an electrical worker.

=== Capacitors ===
Capacitor banks are used in substations to balance the lagging current draw from inductive loads (such as motors, transformers, and some industrial equipment) with their reactive load. Additional capacitor capacity may be needed if dispersed generation (such as small diesel generators, rooftop photovoltaic solar panels, or wind turbines) are added to the system. Capacitors can reduce the current in wires, helping stem system losses from voltage drop or enabling extra power to be sent through the conductors. Capacitors may be left on in response to constant inductive load or turned on when inductive load is increased, such as in the summer for air conditioners. The switching may be remote and can be done manually or automatically.

=== Control rooms ===
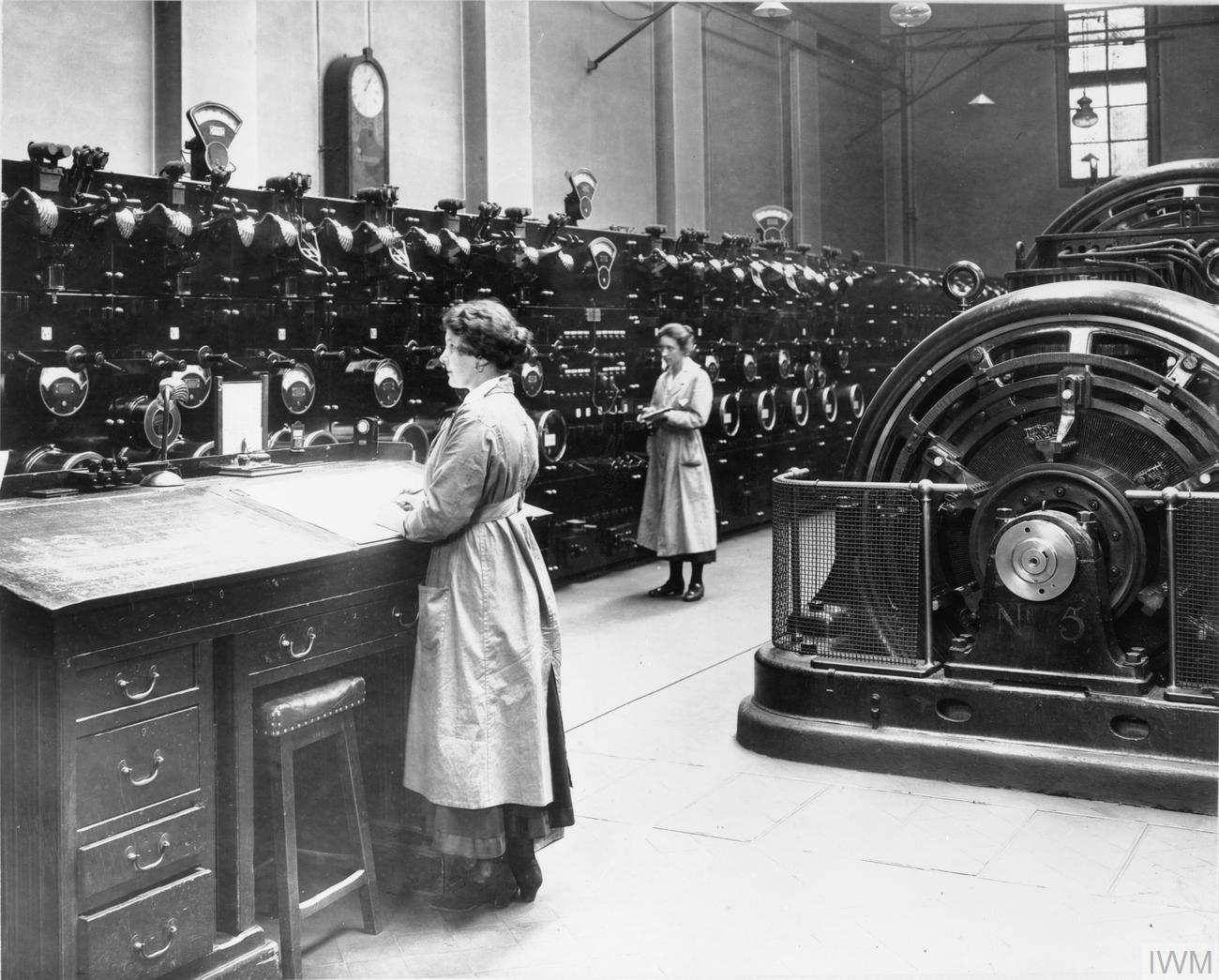
Workers at a substation in Glasgow during World War I, monitoring and recording voltages. The machines on the right are rotary converters.

Larger substations have control rooms for the equipment used to monitor, control, and protect the rest of the substation equipment. It often contains protective relays, meters, breaker controls, communications, batteries, and recorders that save detailed data about substation operations, particularly when there is any unusual activity, to help reconstruct what happened after the fact. These control rooms typically are heated and air conditioned to ensure the reliable operation of this equipment. Additional equipment is necessary to handle power surges associated with intermittent renewable energy such as dispersed generation from wind or solar.

=== Transformers ===
Most transformers lose between 5 and 1.5 percent of their input as heat and noise. Iron losses are no-load and constant whenever the transformer is energized, while copper and auxiliary losses are proportionate to the square of the current. Auxiliary losses are due to running fans and pumps which is noisy when the transformer is operating at maximum capacity. To reduce noise, enclosures are often built around the transformer and can also be added after the substation is built.

Oil-based transformers are often built with bunded areas to prevent the escape of flaming or leaking oil. Fire separation areas or firewalls are built around the transformer to stop the spread of fire. Firefighting vehicles are allowed a path to access the area.

== Maintenance ==
Maintenance of substations involves inspections, data collection and analysis, and routine scheduled work. Using methods such as infrared scanning and dissolved gas analysis, it can be predicted when the substation will need maintenance and predict dangers before they materialize. Infrared technology finds hot spots in the substation where electrical energy is being converted to heat, which indicates a problem and can cause additional damage from the high heat. Dissolved gas analysis can tell when an oil-insulated transformer needs to have the oil filtered or replaced, and also detect other issues.

== Automation ==
Early electrical substations required manual switching or adjustment of equipment, and manual collection of data for load, energy consumption, and abnormal events. As the complexity of distribution networks grew, it became economically necessary to automate supervision and control of substations from a centrally attended point, to allow overall coordination in case of emergencies and to reduce operating costs. Early efforts to remote control substations used dedicated communication wires, often run alongside power circuits. Power-line carrier, microwave radio, fiber optic cables as well as dedicated wired remote control circuits have all been applied to Supervisory Control and Data Acquisition (SCADA) for substations. The development of the microprocessor made for an exponential increase in the number of points that could be economically controlled and monitored. Today, standardized communication protocols such as DNP3, IEC 61850 and Modbus, to list a few, are used to allow multiple intelligent electronic devices to communicate with each other and supervisory control centers. Distributed automatic control at substations is one element of the so-called smart grid.
