= Vienna rectifier =

Pulse-width modulation rectifier

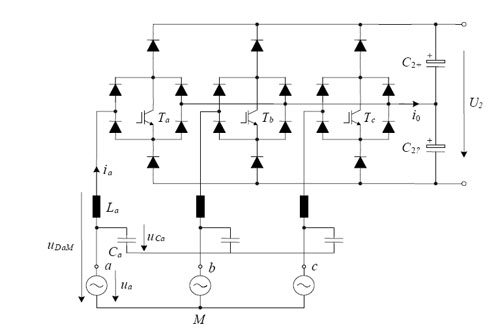
Fig. 1: Schematic of a Vienna rectifier

The Vienna rectifier is a three-phase AC pulse-width modulation rectifier, invented in 1993 by Johann W. Kolar at TU Wien, a public research university in Vienna, Austria.

== Features ==
The Vienna rectifier provides the following features:

- Three-phase three-level three-switch PWM rectifier with controlled output voltage
- Three-wire input, no connection to neutral
- Ohmic mains behaviour
- Boost system (continuous input current)
- Unidirectional power flow
- High power density
- Low conducted common-mode electro-magnetic interference (EMI) emissions
- Simple control to stabilize the neutral point potential
- Low complexity, low realization effort
- Low switching losses
- Reliable behaviour (guaranteeing ohmic mains behaviour) under heavily unbalanced mains voltages and in case of mains failure

== Topology ==
The Vienna rectifier is a unidirectional three-phase three-switch three-level pulse-width modulation (PWM) rectifier. It can be seen as a three-phase diode bridge with an integrated boost converter.

== Applications ==
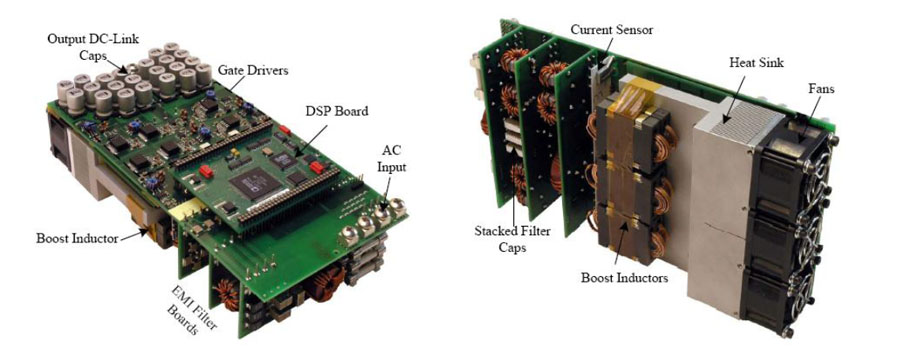
Fig. 2: Top and bottom views of an air-cooled 10kW-Vienna rectifier (400kHz PWM)

The Vienna rectifier is useful wherever six-switch converters are used for achieving sinusoidal mains current and controlled output voltage, when no energy feedback from the load into the mains is available. In practice, use of the Vienna rectifier is advantageous when space is at a sufficient premium to justify the additional hardware cost. These include:

- Telecommunications power supplies.
- Uninterruptible power supplies.
- Input stages of AC-drive converter systems.

Figure 2 shows the top and bottom views of an air-cooled 10 kW-Vienna rectifier (400 kHz PWM), with sinusoidal input current s and controlled output voltage. Dimensions are 250mm x 120mm x 40mm, resulting in a power density of 8.5 kW/dm^{3}. The total weight of the converter is 2.1 kg

== Current and voltage waveforms ==
Fig 3:Time variation of voltage-phases ua, ub, uc of the current-phases ia, ib, ic. From top to bottom: 1) mains voltages ua, ub, uc. 2) mains currents ia, ib, ic. 3) rectifier voltage at uDaM (see Fig. 1), which forms the input current. 4. Midpoint current of the output capacitors (i0 in Fig. 1). 5. Voltage between mains midpoint M and the output voltage midpoint 0. Note: Inner mains inductance is not considered, and therefore the voltage across the filter capacitors is equal to the mains voltage.

Figure 3 shows the system behaviour, calculated using the power-electronics circuit simulator. Between the output voltage midpoint (0) and the mains midpoint (M) the common mode voltage u0M appears, as is characteristic in three-phase converter systems.

== Current control and balance of the neutral point at the DC-side ==
It is possible to separately control the input current shape in each branch of the diode bridge by inserting a bidirectional switch into the node, as shown in Figure 3. The switch Ta controls the current by controlling the magnetization of the inductor. When the bi-directional switch is turned on, the input voltage is applied across the inductor and the current in the inductor rises linearly. Turning off the switch causes the voltage across the inductor to reverse and the current to flow through the freewheeling diodes Da+ and Da-, decreasing linearly. By controlling the switch on-time, the topology is able to control the current in phase with the mains voltage, presenting a resistive load behavior (power-factor correction capability).

To generate a sinusoidal power input which is in phase with the voltage $\underline{i}_D = G \star \underline{u}_C \approx G \star \underline{u}_1$ the average voltage space vector over a pulse-period must satisfy: $\underline{u}_D\star = \underline{u}-j\omega_1L_1\underline{1}_D$ For high switching frequencies or low inductivities we require ($L1$) $\underline{u}_D \star \approx \underline{u}_1$. The available voltage space vectors required for the input voltage are defined by the switching states $(sa,sb,sc)$ and the direction of the phase currents. For example, for $iDa>0,iDb,iDc<0$, i.e. for the phase-range$\phi_1 = -30^\circ...+30^\circ$ of the period($\phi_1$) the phase of the input current space vector is $i_D \approx i_1$). Fig. 4 shows the conduction states of the system, and from this we get the input space vectors shows in Fig. 5

Fig 5: Conduction states of the Vienna rectifier, for ia>0, ib,ic<0, valid in a $60^o$ sector of the period T1 sa, sb, and sc characterise the switching state of the system. The arrows represent the physical direction and value of the current midpoint i0.

== See also ==
- Warsaw rectifier
