= Housing at the Massachusetts Institute of Technology =

Undergraduate and graduate dormitories

Coordinates: 42.35804°N 71.0995°W

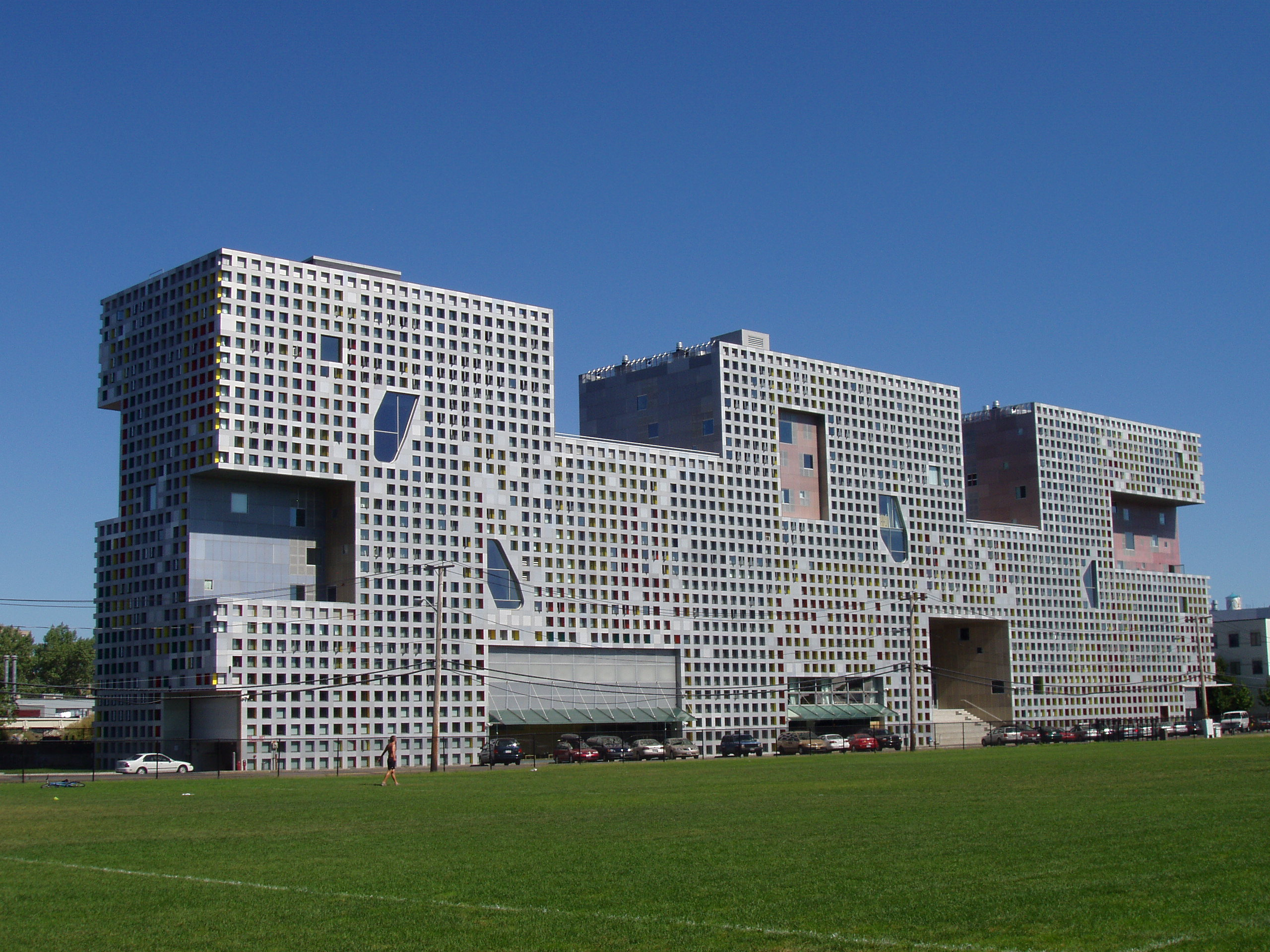
Simmons Hall, a large undergraduate dormitory designed by Steven Holl

At the Massachusetts Institute of Technology (MIT), students are housed in eleven undergraduate dormitories and eight graduate dormitories. All undergraduate students are required to live in an MIT residence during their first year of study. Undergraduate dormitories are usually divided into suites or floors, and usually have Graduate Resident Assistants (GRA), graduate students living among the undergraduates who help support student morale and social activities. Many MIT undergraduate dormitories are known for their distinctive student cultures and traditions.

Both undergraduate and graduate dormitories have a resident Head of House, usually a member of the MIT faculty, living in a special apartment suite within the building. Some larger dormitories have multiple Heads of House, each responsible for a section of the building, who consult together on building-wide issues.

McCormick Hall is a women-only dormitory; all other dormitories are coeducational. Westgate and the Graduate Tower at Site 4 are designated for graduate student family housing, and all other dormitories are reserved for single students.

In addition, a portion of MIT undergraduate sophomores, juniors, and seniors live in MIT-approved fraternities and sororities, and Independent Living Groups, collectively known as FSILGs. These are located either on campus or nearby in Cambridge, the Back Bay or Fenway-Kenmore neighborhoods of Boston, or Brookline, Massachusetts.

== Overview ==
=== Dormitory cultures ===
Over the years, MIT undergrad dormitories have developed a diverse range of cultures and traditions. With occasional local exceptions, the West Campus dormitories (Maseeh, McCormick, Baker, Burton-Conner, MacGregor, New House, Next House, Simmons, New Vassar) have tended to be more mainstream in their outlook, while the East Side dormitories (East Campus, Senior House, Random, Bexley) have been the home of many different subcultures, such as LGBTQ, Goth, counterculture, and anarchist. Since 2002, MIT has required all first-year undergrads to reside in dormitories, partly to control irresponsible abuse of alcohol in some fraternities, which had resulted in the death of a freshman. Since then, the total undergraduate enrollment at MIT has been partially constrained by the number of dormitory spaces available.

There are also specialized subgroups of students within some of the larger dormitories, usually based on shared interests, language, or culture. Examples include French House, German House, La Casa, Chocolate City, Juniper, and iHouse.

Upon arrival, first-year students are temporarily assigned to on-campus dormitory housing, based on a preliminary application and a lottery. They occupy this room as a homebase while they participate in Orientation and Residence Exploration (REX, also informally called "Dorm Rush") week, when the upper-class residents of various dormitories offer special events to highlight their individual cultures and amenities. Students who wish to switch residences apply for the First Year Residence Exchange (FYRE) program, subject to availability of spaces. If they cannot move immediately, they can apply to move at the start of the next semester.

In years when there is a shortage of undergrad housing (historically caused by scheduled major renovations, unexpected building system failures, or unanticipated peaks in admissions yield rates), a "temporary overflow housing" program is declared. Extra spaces are found by measures such as placing more students in rooms, using suite lounge spaces, renting hotel rooms, and other temporary expedients.

"New Vassar", a 450-bed undergrad dormitory at 189 Vassar Street (Building W46), was completed in the fall of 2020 and opened for students in the spring semester of 2021.

=== Design goals ===
In 2016, the MIT administration published its guidelines for design of new and renovation of older undergraduate dormitories. An ideal size of 350 students per dormitory, organized into "clusters" of 30 students was proposed, consisting of 30-40% singles and the remainder double-occupancy rooms. Each room is to be equipped with furniture made of durable oak wood, designed to be modular and somewhat reconfigurable by the residents. Three bathrooms (allowing flexible gender designation) would be shared by each cluster of rooms, equipped with shared sinks and individually enclosed toilets and showers.

The report viewed shared cooking and dining facilities as essential parts of MIT student life and education. Some dormitories would contain dining halls, and others would be designated as "cook-for-yourself" residences. Both types would also have some accommodations for larger group dining and individual or group cooking, including large "country kitchens" for groups of students working together. Informal and formal teaching about diet and cooking would be encouraged, in response to the expressed interest of many MIT students in learning how to cook. Dining halls would be structured for ease of access by other members of the MIT community, including students, faculty, and staff not residing in the host dormitory, to facilitate wider social interactions and events.

The guidelines say that a number of rooms and facilities should be shared dormitory-wide, such as spaces for music rehearsal, games, media viewing, studying, exercising, meeting, and other individual or group activities. Makerspaces are increasingly emphasized to support MIT's founding Mens et Manus ("Mind and Hand") ethos and participation in the arts and athletics. A large enclosed exterior space or courtyard should be provided, gated for security while permitting wider community access for special occasions, and protected from solar glare and excessive wind.

The guidelines also state that dormitories should be designed to qualify for LEED gold certification, including central air conditioning to discourage improvised window air conditioner installations and to enable year-round use of the buildings. The new Vassar Street dormitory (Building W46) was specifically designed with these guidelines in mind.

=== Dormitory dining options ===
The MIT administration has emphasized incorporation of shared dining facilities into several larger undergraduate dormitories, as places where daily informal social interactions can occur. After discontinuation of "mandatory commons" dining in 1970, MIT continued to operate dining halls in several dormitories on an opt-in meal plan basis. Required meal plans were reinstituted in fall 2011 for residents of several dormitories, despite the vigorous objections of some students. As of 2023, the MIT meal plans offer a mix of choices, required for residents of some dormitories, and optional for all other undergraduates and all grad students.

As of 2023, the mandatory meal plan dormitories are:

- Baker House
- Maseeh Hall (the only meal plan hall which is also open for lunch)
- McCormick Hall
- New Vassar
- Next House
- Simmons Hall

The other dormitories are designated as "cook-for-yourself" communities, and have kitchens on each floor, or in each suite of apartments. Residents of these dormitories may also opt to sign up for a meal plan at another dormitory with dining facilities, or may eat at any dining hall on a "cash" basis. Free shuttle service is available to selected grocery stores off campus and there is a fresh produce market on campus open one day per week throughout most of the calendar year.

== Undergraduate dormitories ==
=== Baker House ===
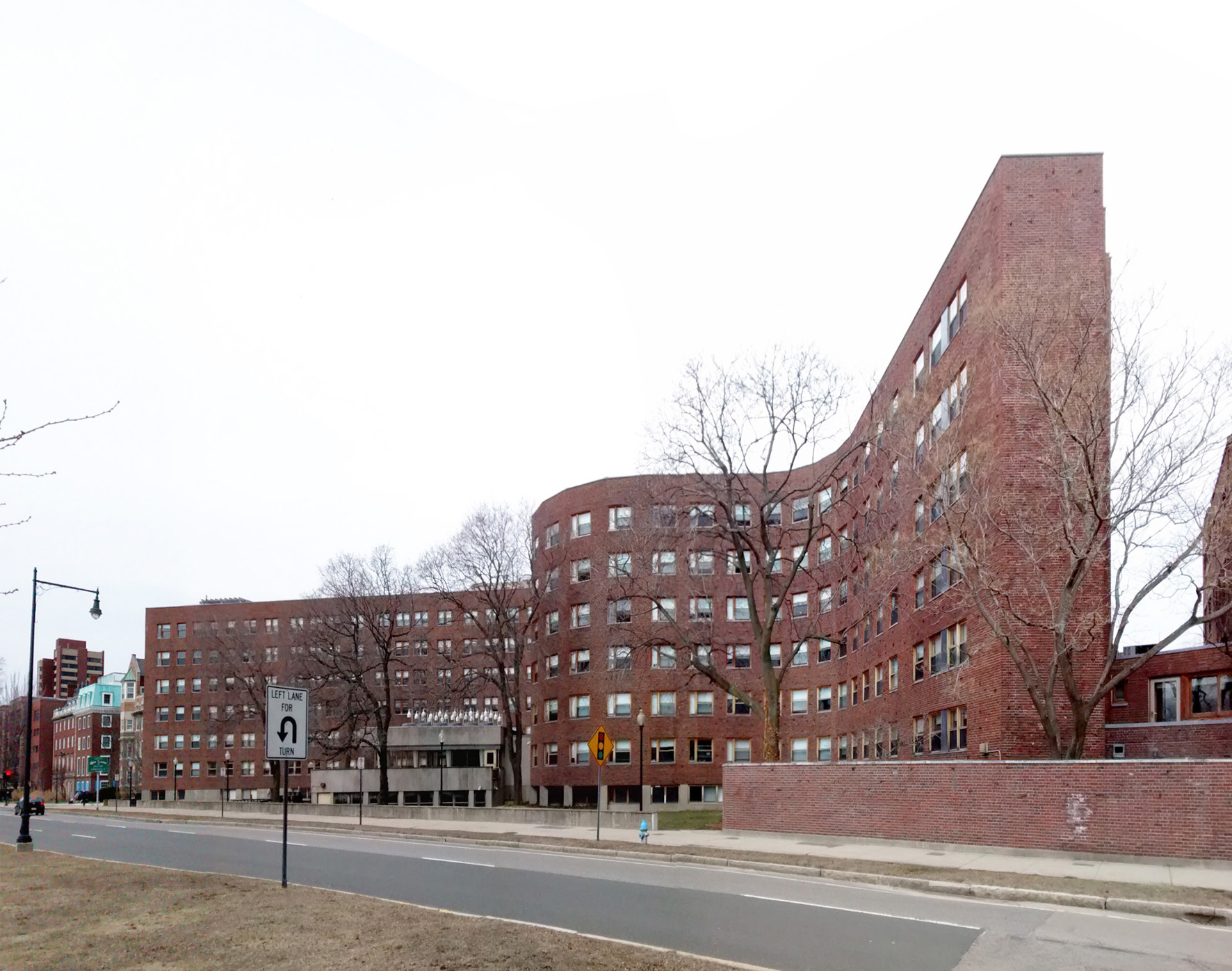
Front facade of Baker House

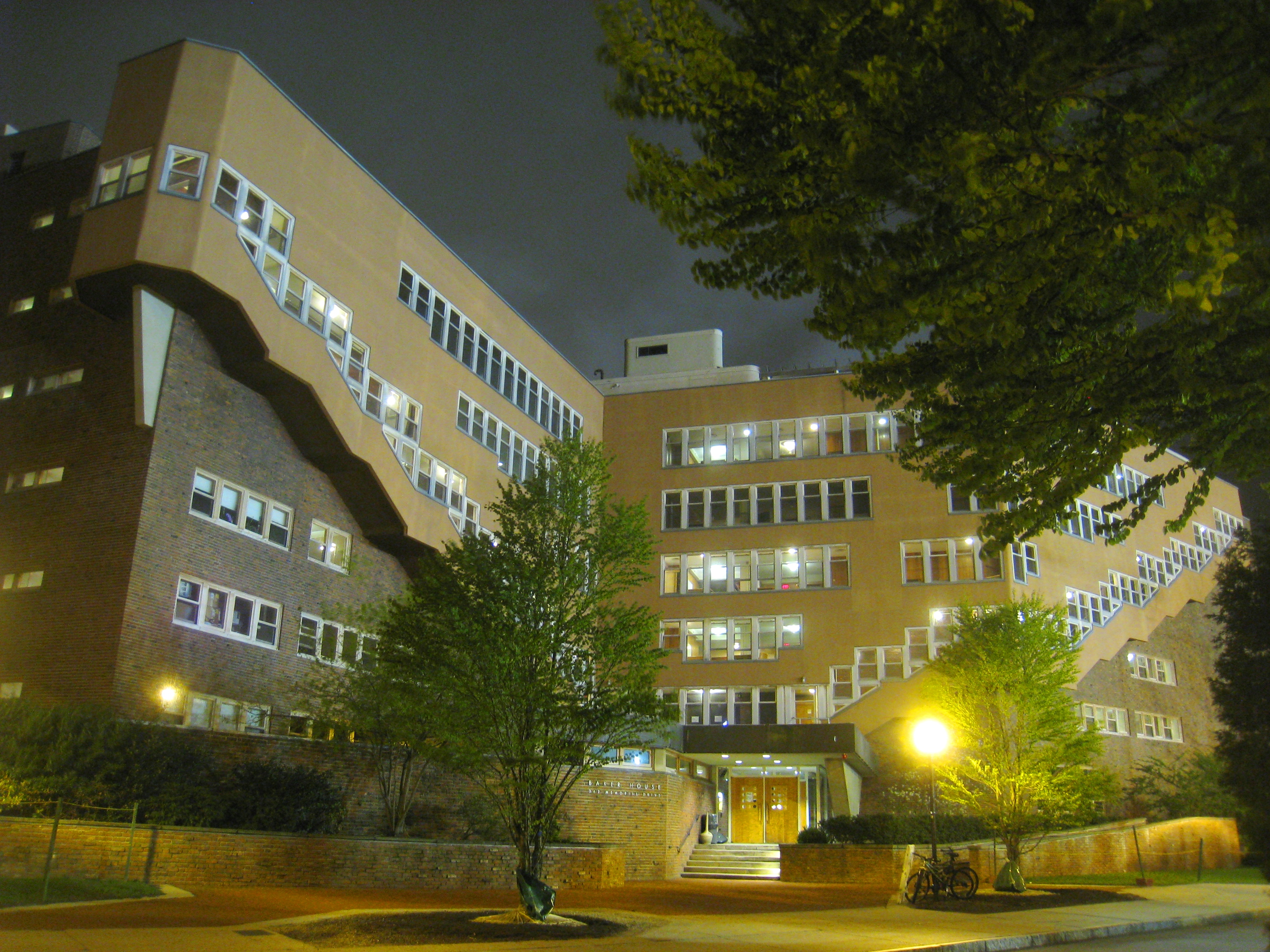
Rear facade of Baker House at night

Baker House, located at 362 Memorial Drive, is a co-ed dormitory at MIT designed by the Finnish architect Alvar Aalto in 1947–1948 and built in 1949. Its distinctive design has an undulating shape which allows most rooms a view of the Charles River, and the dining hall features a "moon garden" roof. Aalto also designed custom furniture for the building's rooms, many of which are wedge-shaped. Baker House was renovated for its fiftieth anniversary in 1999, modernizing the plumbing, telecommunications, and electrical systems and removing some of the interior changes made over the years that were not in Aalto's original design. Baker House celebrated its 75th Anniversary in 2024 with over 382 house alumni in attendance.

The dormitory was named after Everett Moore Baker, an MIT Dean of Students, who died in a plane crash in Egypt in 1949. The dormitory houses 318 undergraduates in single, double, triple, and quadruple rooms.

A Baker House tradition involves dropping an old worn-out piano from the roof. Started by former Baker resident Charles Bruno in 1972, the piano is dropped on Drop Day—the last day MIT students can drop a class with no penalty.

Notable Baker House alumni include Kenneth Olsen (Electrical Engineering, 1950), co-founder of Digital Equipment Corporation; Amar Bose (Electrical Engineering, 1951), founder of the Bose Corporation and inventor of numerous audio technologies; Alan Guth (Physics, 1968), astrophysicist and professor of physics at MIT; Timothy Carney (1966), former US Ambassador to Sudan and Haiti; Gerald Sussman (Mathematics, 1968), professor of computer science at MIT; Geoffrey A. Landis (Physics and Electrical Engineering, 1980), NASA scientist and science fiction writer; Ronald T. Raines (Chemistry and Biology, 1980), professor of chemistry at MIT; Cady Coleman (Chemistry, 1983), NASA Astronaut; Wes Bush (1983), former chairman and CEO, Northrop Grumman; Warren Madden (1985), Weather Channel meteorologist; Jonathan Gruber (Economics, 1987), healthcare economist and political advisor; Charles Korsmo (Physics, 2000), actor in movies such as Hook and Can't Hardly Wait; Ed Miller (Physics and Electrical Engineering, 2000), noted poker authority; and Katy Croff Bell (Ocean Engineering, 2000), National Geographic ocean explorer.

=== Burton-Conner House ===
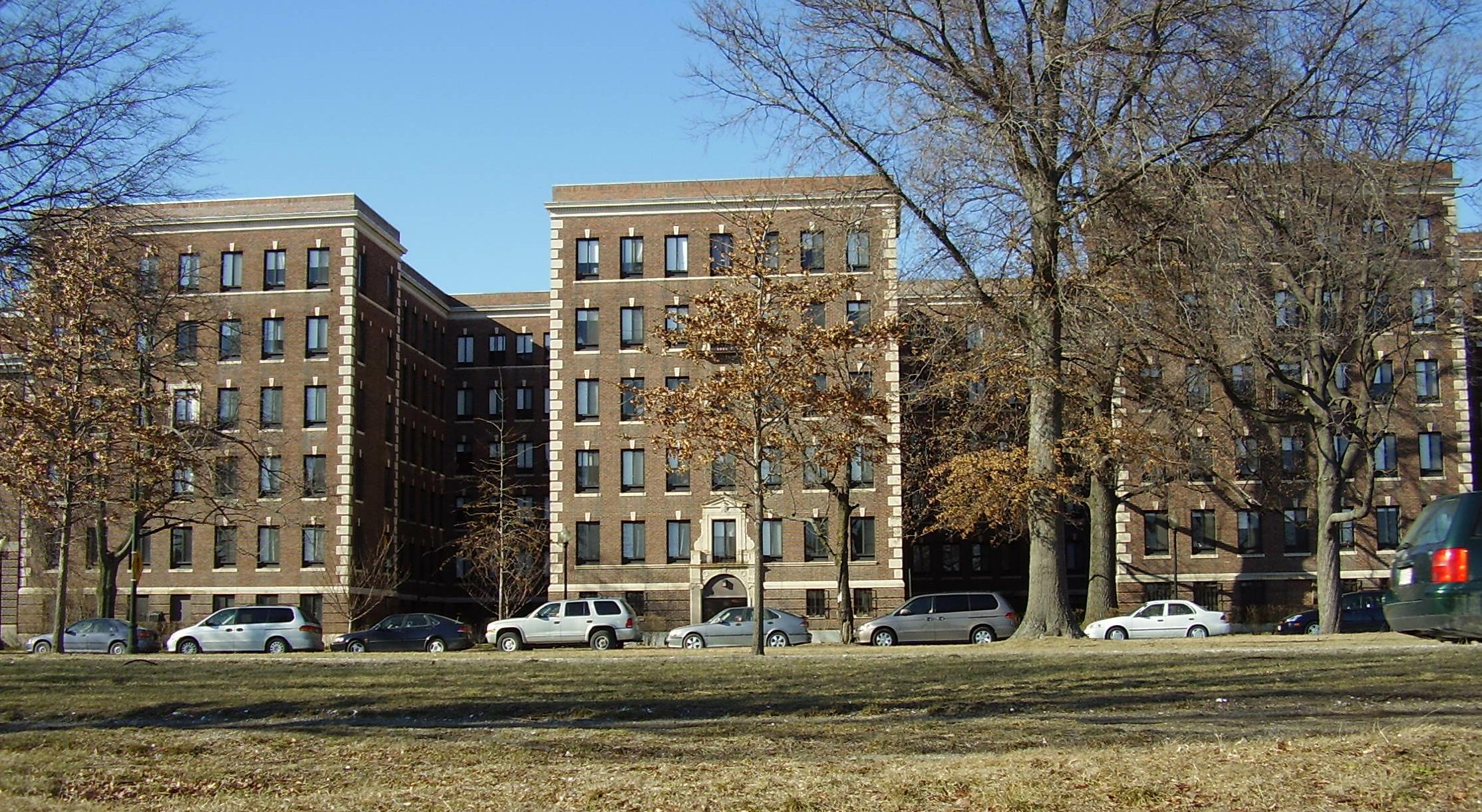
The three "Burton" wings of Burton-Conner House, viewed from Memorial Drive

Burton-Conner House, (shortened to Burton-Conner or BC), is located at 410 Memorial Drive, on the north bank of the Charles River. Burton-Conner houses 344 residents. The building is five stories high, plus a ground floor.

Burton-Conner is a combination of two major sections of the former "Riverside" hotel and apartment building, which MIT acquired and reopened as a dormitory in 1950. "Burton House" consists of the 3 westernmost wings, while "Conner Hall" comprises the remaining 2 wings of the extended E-shaped structure. Burton is named after former dean Alfred Edgar Burton. The two sections of the building are physically separated by a firewall above the ground floor, with five residential floors on the Burton side and four on the Conner side.

In the 1960s, a dining hall was added at the rear of Burton-Conner, on the side away from the river. Some years later, the dining hall was shut down and the space became the Porter Room, a shared meeting and student event space. The entire building underwent a complete restructuring during 1970–1971, when the internal layout was changed from a floor orientation (with floor-wide bathrooms and communal showers) to a suite orientation (introducing kitchens, suite lounges, and semi-private bathrooms).

In February 2019, the MIT administration announced that Burton-Conner would be closed from June 2020 to August 2022 for a complete renovation. Dormitory residents expressed concerns about interim housing and the effects this might have on dormitory culture. The dormitory was re-opened during the wind-down of the COVID-19 pandemic in September 2022, amid criticism that the building was "without landmarks" due to restrictions on students painting traditional wall murals. Canvas panels were offered instead, but the paperwork, approvals needed, and delays were objected to.

BC amenities include a library, a study area, a makerspace, two music rooms, a game room, gym, and a lounge with a kitchen. Burton-Conner retains a number of distinctive traditions rooted in its suite-based culture. Each floor maintains its own culture and elects its own leadership, and many floors install custom artwork or emblems on their walls as expressions of floor pride. A wall on the ground floor features each of the nine floor emblems painted by residents, updated over the years.

=== East Campus ===
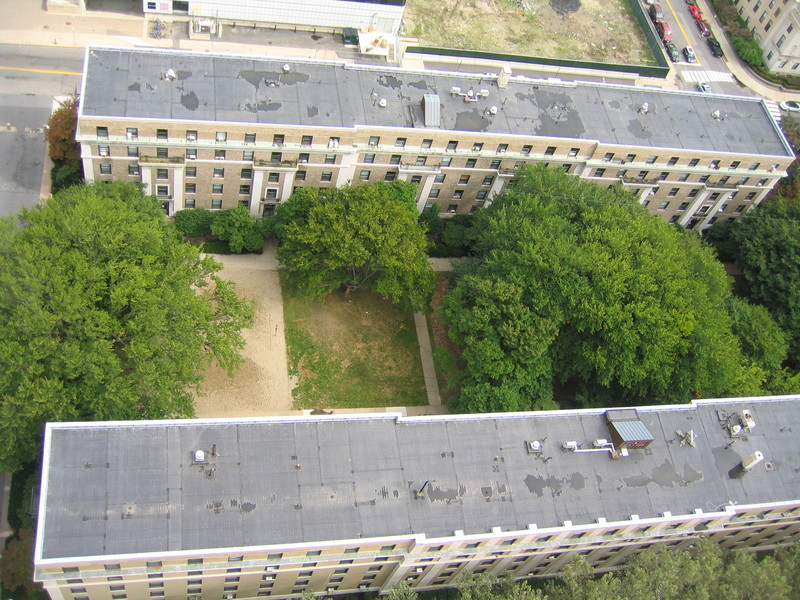
As viewed from the west, aerial view of the two parallels of East Campus

As viewed from the south, this courtyard between the parallels is the site of cook-outs and celebrations

Variously known as East Campus, East Campus Alumni Memorial Houses, and Fred the Dorm, East Campus is MIT's second oldest dormitory after the now closed Senior House. Located at 3 Ames Street, it is an undergraduate dormitory formed from six "houses", each named after an alumnus of MIT:

East parallel, north to south:

- Goodale (Charles W. Goodale, 1875)
- Bemis (Albert Farwell Bemis, 1893, member of the MIT Corporation from 1914 to 1936)
- Walcott (William W. Walcott, 1901)
West parallel, north to south:
- Wood (Kenneth F. Wood, 1894)
- Hayden (Charles Hayden, 1890, member of the MIT Corporation from 1907 to 1929)
- Munroe (James P. Munroe, 1882, Secretary of the MIT Corporation from 1907 to 1929)

East Campus is arranged in two long north–south buildings, the East Parallel (one house built in 1924, extended to full parallel in 1928) and the West Parallel (built in 1931). The buildings are numbered 64 and 62, respectively, in MIT's building numbering system. There are 5 floors plus a non-residential basement in each building. The three "houses" that make up a building are connected on each floor, functioning as one contiguous building. Residents identify themselves according to the ten "halls": First East through Fifth East, and First West through Fifth West. The two building basements are connected via a tunnel.

The dormitory celebrated its 90th anniversary in 2014. Due to the dormitory's age, sturdiness, and tradition, the 350-400 undergrads living there are allowed to paint and alter rooms and floor common spaces, up to the limits of what the Cambridge fire code will allow. Students frequently use technology to customize their rooms, building projects such as an Emergency Pizza Button to have a local pizza shop deliver a cheese pizza, a disco dance floor, and an automatic door-unlocking system.

The social life of East Campus residents includes ambitious build projects (such as a 130-foot (40 m) roller coaster) during REX Rush Week, Bad Ideas Weekend during January, and various feasts and celebrations, generally located in the courtyard between the two parallels. Participants in such events have traditionally included some residents of nearby Senior House (before the undergraduate residents living there were disbanded), and continue to invite alumni of both residences to join in planning and attendance.

Notable alumni of East Campus include Rainer Weiss (Physics, 1955) MIT professor, inventor of the gravitational wave detector, and co-recipient of the 2017 Nobel Prize in Physics; Ahmed Chalabi (Mathematics, 1965) 37th Prime Minister of Iraq; George Smoot (Mathematics and Physics, 1966), second contestant to win the $1 million prize on Are You Smarter than a 5th Grader?, and co-recipient of the 2006 Nobel Prize in Physics; Jacob K. White (Electrical Engineering and Computer Science, 1980), MIT professor and IEEE Fellow; Michael Fincke (Aeronautics and Astronautics, 1989, and Earth, Atmospheric, and Planetary Sciences, 1989), NASA astronaut; Thomas Massie (Electrical Engineering, 1993), US Representative for Kentucky; Arash Ferdowsi (no degree, 2008) co-founder of Dropbox; and Sam Bankman-Fried (Physics, 2014), founder of the cryptocurrency trading firm Alameda Research and the FTX cryptocurrency exchange.

The dormitory was closed for two years beginning in June 2023 for a complete gut renovation. The renewed buildings are now completely air-conditioned, fully ADA-accessible, and include new amenities in common areas. During the closure, East Campus residents were housed in other dormitories, hotel rooms, and the building formerly occupied by an on-campus fraternity which had been disbanded.

=== MacGregor House ===
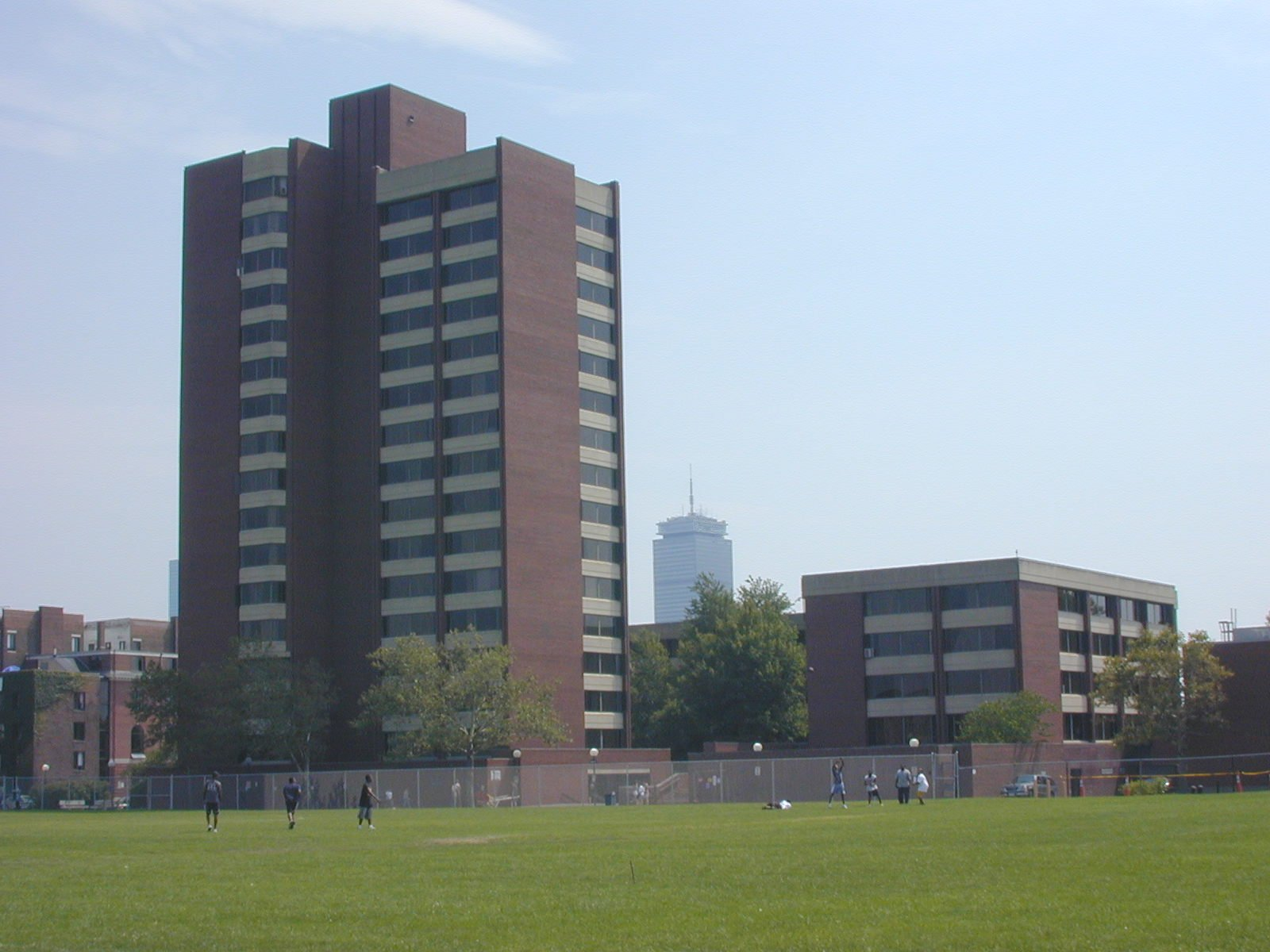
MacGregor House, viewed from Briggs Field, looking towards the Charles River (not visible)

MacGregor House, located at 450 Memorial Drive, was designed by Pietro Belluschi, built in 1970, and named for Frank S. MacGregor (SB 1907, Physics). It consists of a 16-story high-rise tower, connected to a four-story low-rise surrounding a paved courtyard. Both parts consist of suites grouped into "entries" of three to four floors each. The entries are named by letter: A, B, C, D, and E entries are located in the tower and F, G, H, and J entries are located in the low-rise. There is no I-entry, because i is imaginary. The ground floor consists mostly of dormitory-wide common areas.

Each suite in MacGregor houses six to eight people, usually coed; the entire dormitory houses 326 undergrads. Almost all rooms in MacGregor are singles; the three doubles in F entry are an architectural anomaly. Each suite comes equipped with a bathroom and a kitchen area with a 4-burner electric range-top; in addition, one suite in an entry also has an oven.

MacGregor features various amenities, including a music room, game room, and weight room. A convenience store (MacCon) was located inside MacGregor on the first floor, but closed in 2017.

The building and its surroundings are well known on campus for fierce winds and gusts during stormy weather. A computational fluid dynamics (CFD) study examined the causes of this phenomenon in detail, but did not propose any specific measures to ameliorate it.

=== Maseeh Hall ===
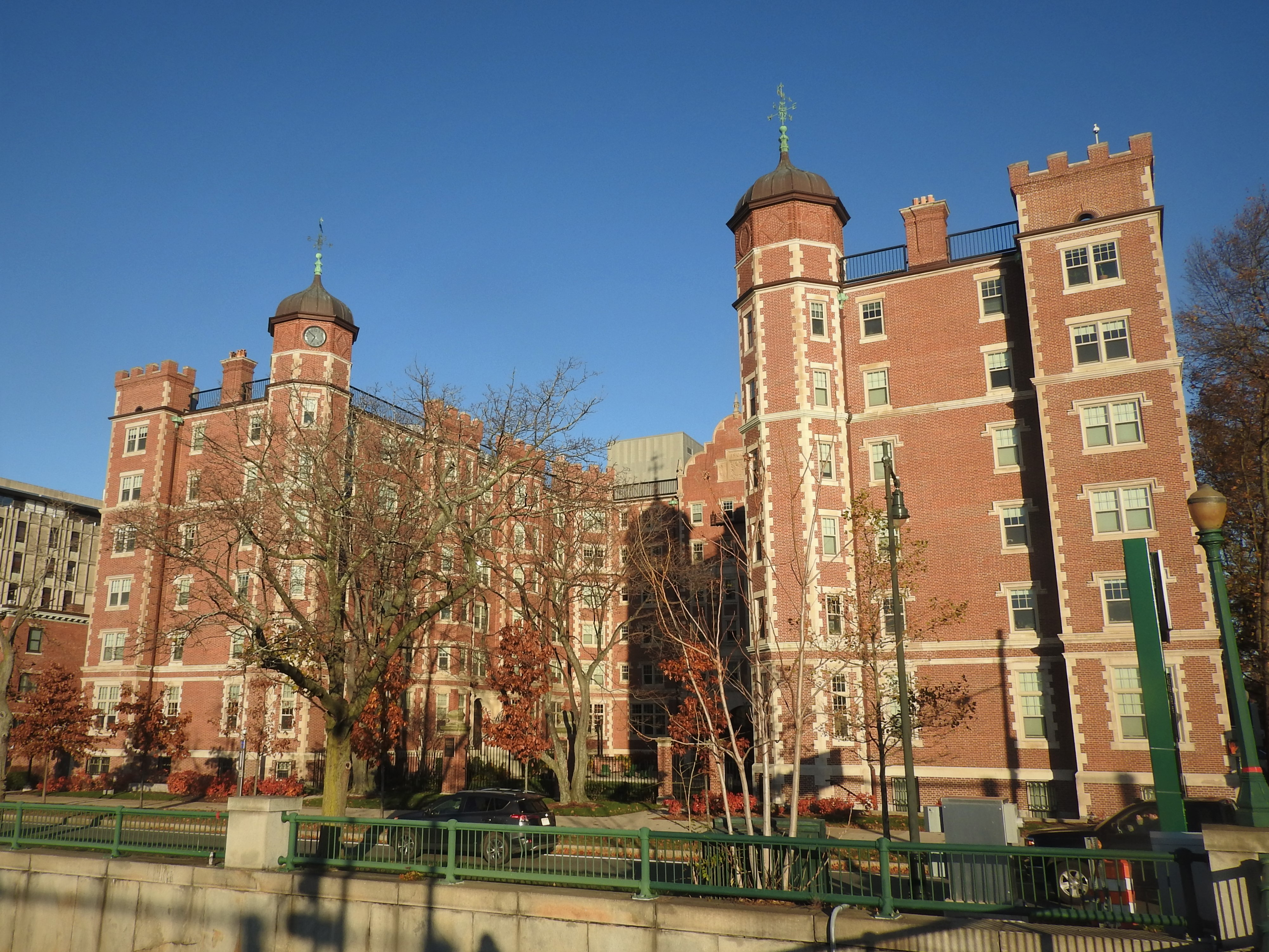
Maseeh Hall (formerly Ashdown House), viewed from the Harvard Bridge

Maseeh Hall is located at 305 Memorial Drive, at the intersection of Memorial Drive and Massachusetts Avenue, across the Avenue from MIT's Building 1. The building itself predates MIT's move to Cambridge in 1916. It was originally operated as the "Riverbank Court Hotel" from 1901 to 1937. In 1938, MIT reopened it as "Graduate House", later renaming it "Ashdown House" after its first faculty housemaster, Avery Allen Ashdown. By the beginning of the 21st century, the building had become run-down and in need of renovation. Graduate students were moved out, to a new Ashdown House (NW35) located much further away, a controversial decision justified by a desire to house all undergrads as close as possible to MIT's central campus. The exterior of the emptied building was immediately repaired to stop water leaks and further deterioration, but there was no funding to renovate the interior of the structure.

In 2010, Fariborz Maseeh (ScD 1990, Civil Engineering) donated $24 million for the purpose of increasing MIT's undergraduate enrollment by 270 students (an increase of 6%). To enable this, the number of undergraduate dormitory beds needed to be increased, since MIT now requires all undergraduate students to live in dormitories on campus for at least their first year. Fariborz Maseeh's donation was used to renovate the building, and the building now bears his name.

Maseeh Hall was first opened to undergrad residents in August 2011. Upon its re-opening, Maseeh Hall was MIT's largest undergrad dormitory with 462 beds; in 2013, the building's occupancy was further increased to 490.

The lobby of Maseeh Hall is architecturally notable for its spacious vaulting and mosaic decorations made of Guastavino tile.

=== McCormick Hall ===
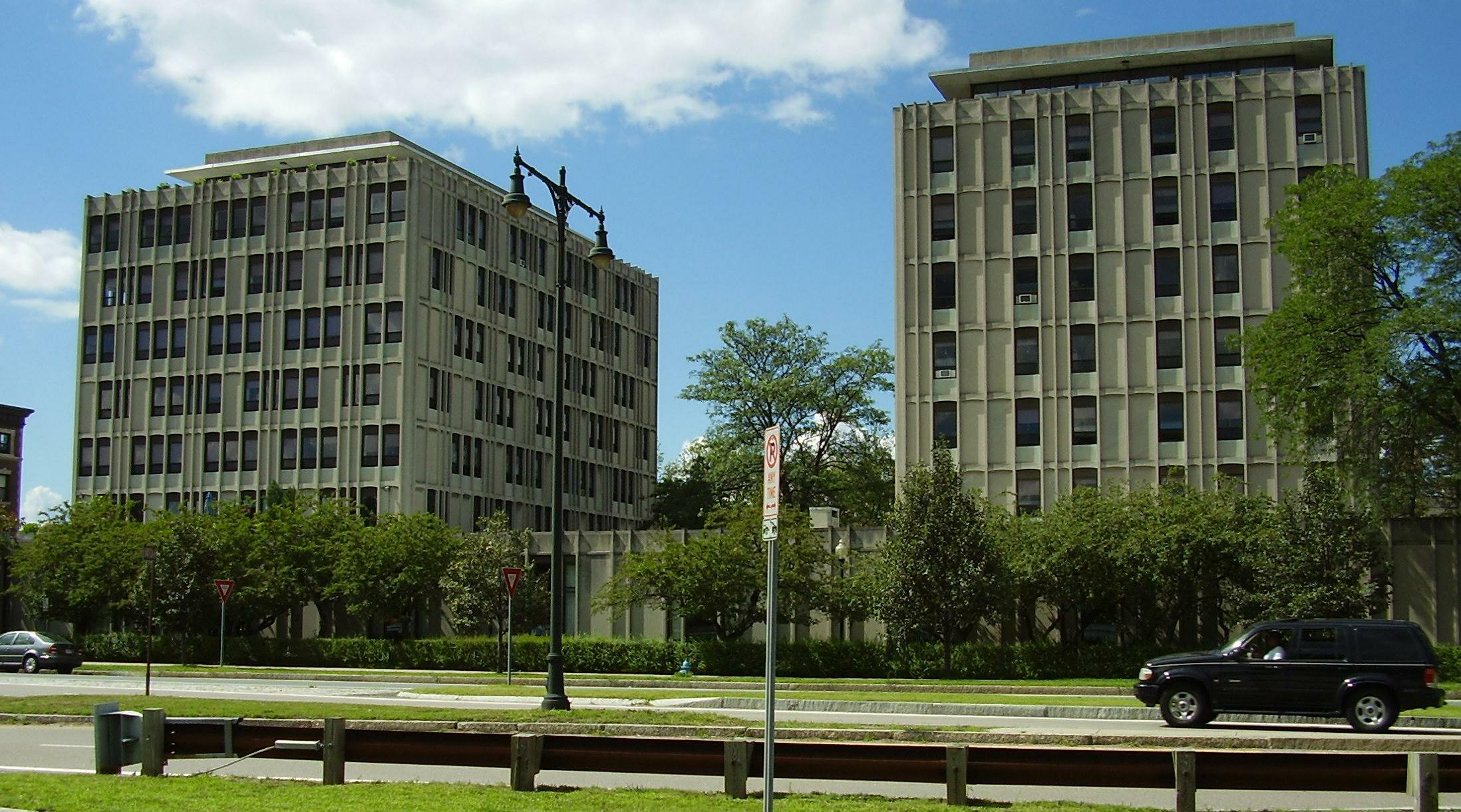
McCormick Hall, viewed from Memorial Drive

McCormick Hall, located at 320 Memorial Drive, is a women-only dormitory housing 237 undergrads. It consists of two 8-floor towers (the east tower and the west tower) and an annex converted from two adjacent brownstone buildings. The three sections are connected on the ground floor. Each tower has a penthouse on the top floor that looks out on the Boston skyline. The east tower has only singles while the west tower has singles, doubles, and triples. The funds for building McCormick Hall came from Katharine Dexter McCormick (SB 1904, Biology), a leading biologist, suffragist, and philanthropist in the early twentieth century. McCormick Hall was designed to advocate and encourage female participation in the field of STEM, supporting gender equality in the former US educational system.

Herbert Beckwith, a faculty member in the MIT architecture department, was the designer of McCormick Hall. The west tower was first built in 1963 and the east tower was built later in 1967.

=== New House ===
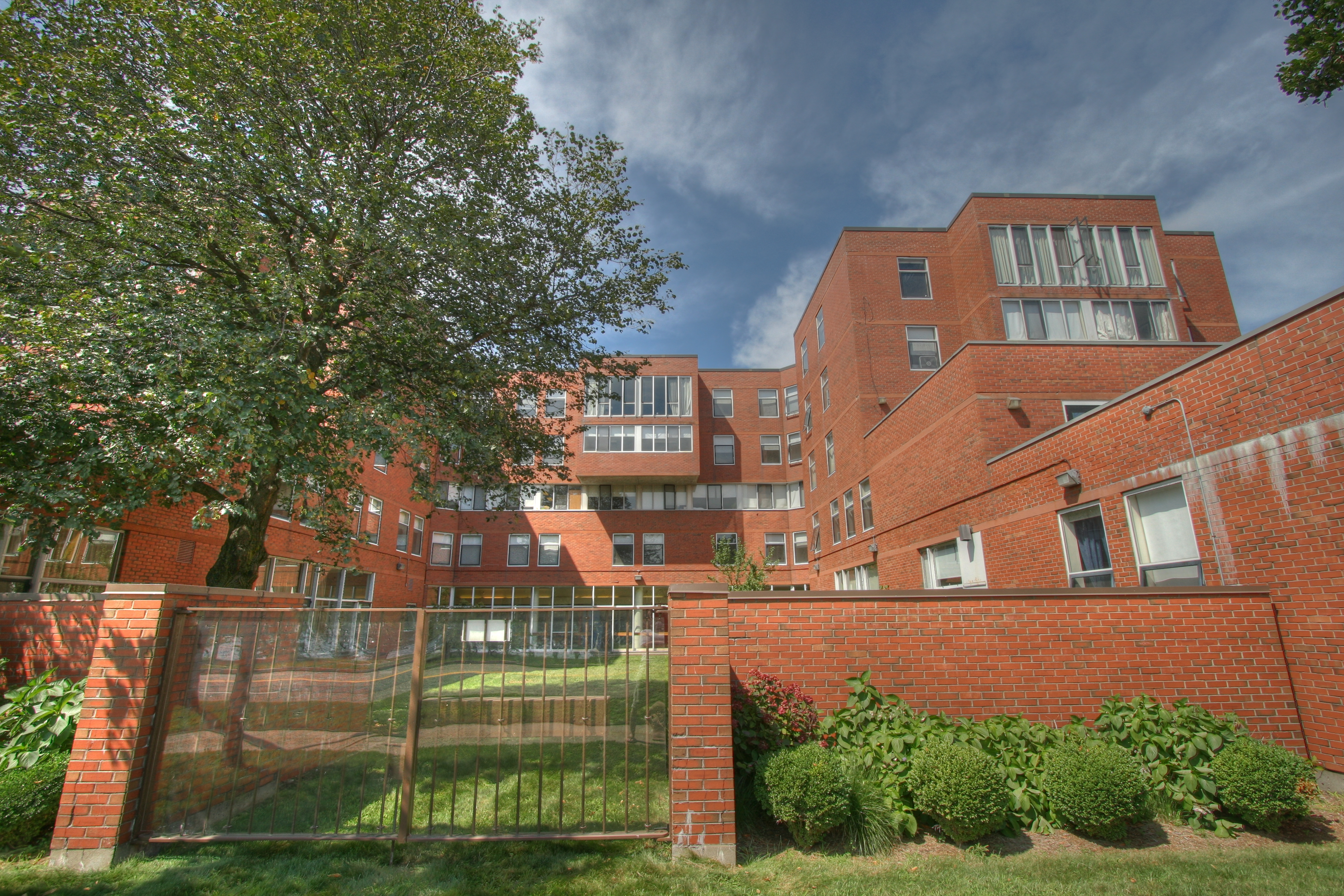
New House, as seen from Memorial Drive

New House, sometimes referred to as New West Campus Houses, houses 291 undergraduates at 471–476 Memorial Drive. The dormitory is a series of six joined five-story buildings arranged in a zig-zag fashion, each named after alumni. There are kitchens and common areas scattered throughout the dormitory. There is a tunnel connecting New House and neighboring MacGregor House.

New House was constructed in 1975 and holds nine separate living groups. From 2017 to 2018, New House underwent an extensive renovation to upgrade infrastructure and improve quality of life. The renovation improved accessibility, enhanced environmental sustainability, and brought in new amenities. New features of the renovated dormitory included an arcade, an improved first-floor lounge, and interconnected corridors on upper floors.

However, residents lamented the significant impact on student communities that resulted from the renovation project. Students noted that the "pre-existing culture of New House...has largely been lost", pointing to the stress of having to frequently move between temporary housing buildings and the difficulty of rebuilding communities in such circumstances. The renovation destroyed historical murals painted by former students, further contributing to the sense of a loss of culture and tradition.

=== New Vassar ===
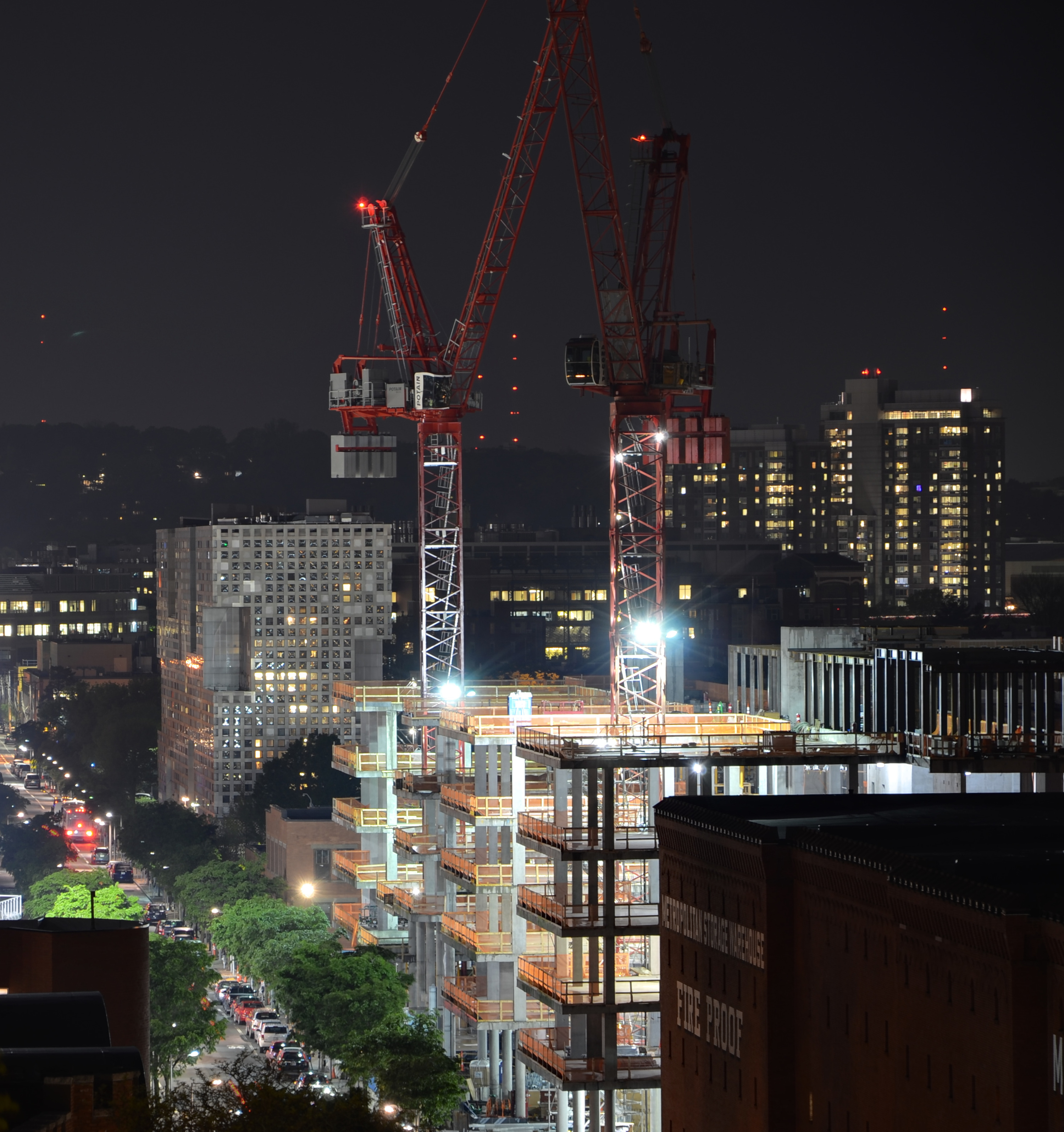
New Vassar construction site, May 2019

Front facade of New Vassar

New Vassar (W46) is the newest completed dormitory, opened for the first time in spring semester 2021, accommodating 450 students.

The building is located at 189 Vassar Street, the site of a former parking facility named West Garage. The dormitory was approved in December 2017, and construction commenced with the demolition of the garage in January 2018. On February 28, 2019, an accident at the construction site killed one worker and injured two others. Evidence suggests that a material collapse from an upper floor fell down on top of the three workers.

MIT portrays New Vassar as a "living-learning community" that helps students grow both academically and personally. Dormitory amenities, including a dining hall, a communal kitchen, a courtyard, a makerspace, and group study lounges, were chosen to promote social engagement. The building's design also prioritized environmental sustainability, targeting a LEED Gold certification.

However, MIT students have criticized the design process for New Vassar as "a history of broken promises", with valuable student feedback "destroyed by top-down administrative backtracking". Early in the design stage for New Vassar, MIT administrators sought student input to articulate a set of guiding principles for future dormitories, making mutually acceptable compromise between student well-being and administrative needs. Later, administrators unilaterally reversed several decisions without student approval. The incident drew heavy criticism of MIT's leadership and decision-making process, with extensive student feedback and cooperation regularly being overturned with "vague appeals" to statistical data.

=== Next House ===
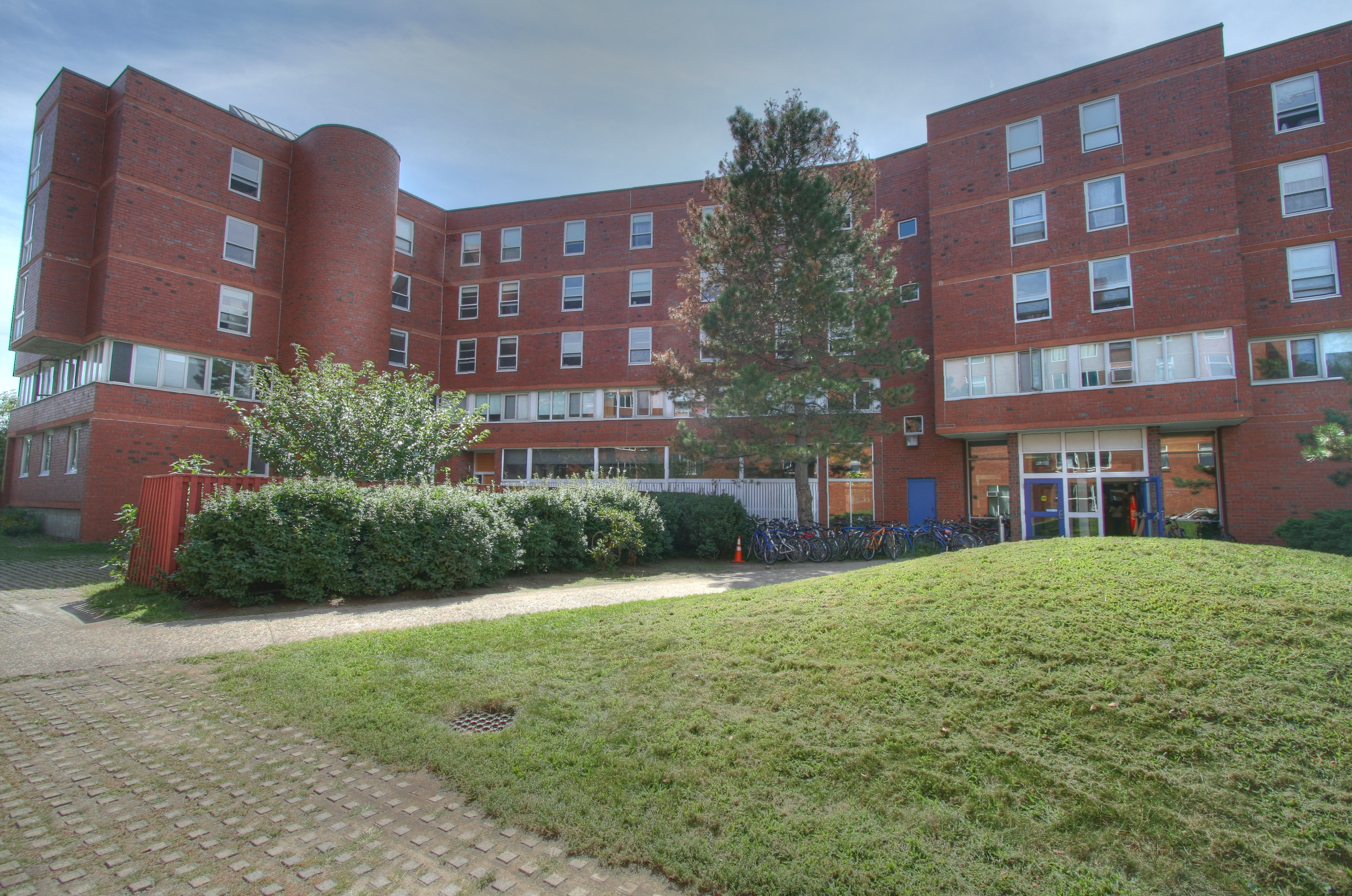
Next House, as seen from Amherst Alley

Next House, located at 500 Memorial Drive, is five stories tall and houses about 350 people. Patterned after the success of Baker House, it opened in September 1981. The "Next House" designation was unofficial and thought to be temporary until a sufficient donation had been received to name the dormitory. As a result, the institute has nearly always referred to the building as 500 Memorial Drive, while students have always called the dormitory "Next House".

The first level is home to the Tastefully Furnished Lounge (TFL), along with music practice rooms, Next Dining (open daily to all MIT students for breakfast and dinner), Athena computing cluster, and workout rooms. The TFL was so named at the first Next House governance meeting: the words "Tastefully Furnished Lounge" had originally appeared in an official brochure distributed at the dedication ceremonies for MacGregor House, and were ironically adopted because the space was initially barely furnished at all. The Next House basement level offers a laundry room, game area, and the Country Kitchen.

=== Random Hall ===
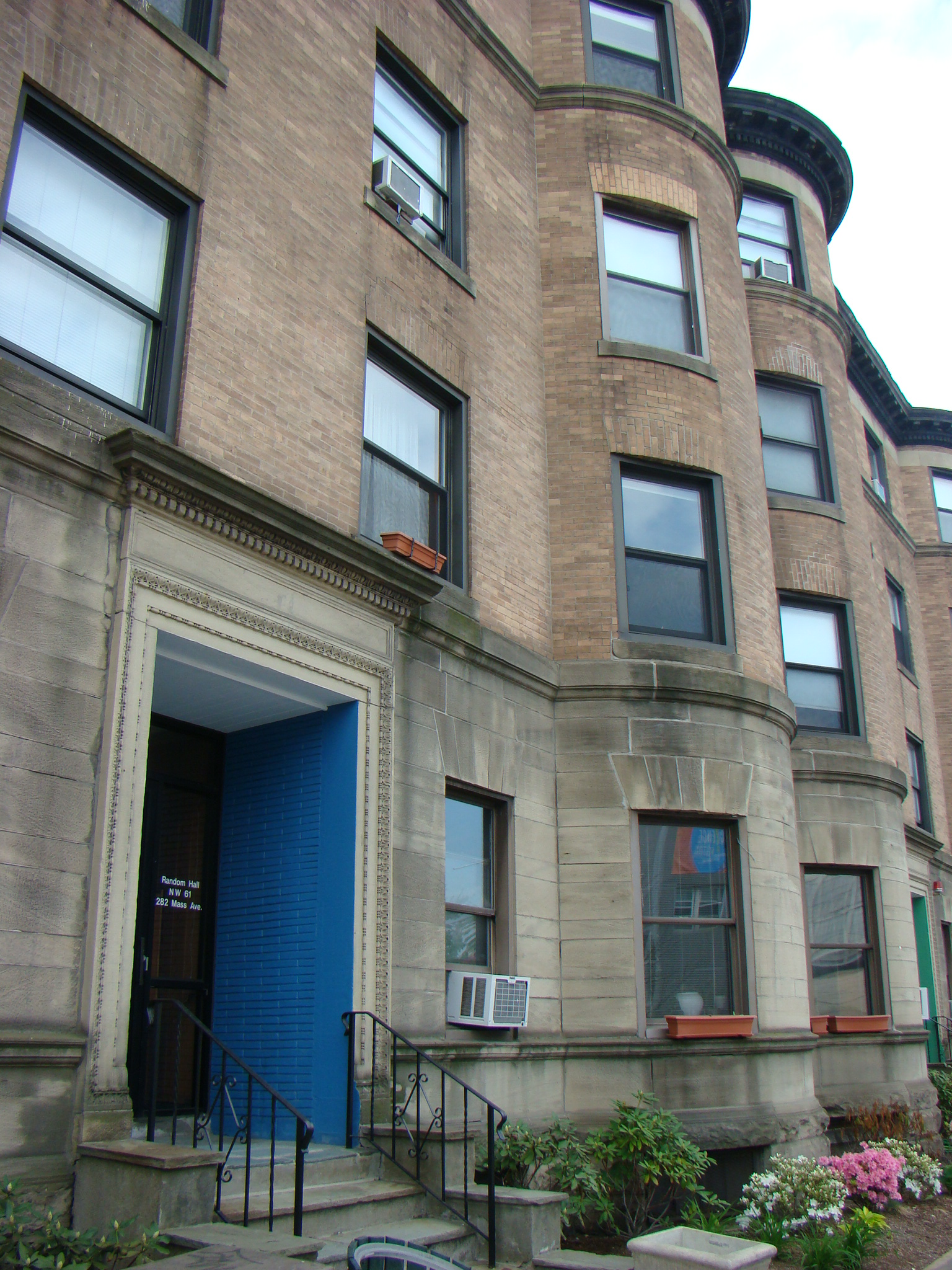
Random Hall, viewed from Massachusetts Avenue

Random Hall located at 290 Massachusetts Avenue, was created by the joining of two old, identical buildings, a process known to some residents as "siamization". It is the oldest building owned by MIT, and lacks elevators. Originally built in 1894, the building was converted to a visiting students and overflow dormitory in 1968. In the spring and summer of 1977, it was quickly remodeled for undergraduate use to accommodate the unexpectedly large matriculation of the Class of 1981. Random Hall is the smallest of the MIT dormitories, housing only about 93 undergraduates. Its location is also unique among undergraduate dormitories, being about a block past the northern border of the main campus.

Random Hall was known for its early implementation of bathroom and laundry machine online servers, which allowed people to determine remotely whether bathrooms and washers or dryers are in use.

Random Hall was the home of The Milk, a 32-year-old carton of rancid milk. The carton was originally purchased by Justin O. Cave '98 in 1994 for the purpose of making macaroni and cheese. After forgetting to consume it, residents of Random Hall rediscovered it ten months after its expiration date. The incident gave rise to several activities and celebrations regarding The Milk, including birthday parties, awards for the "Ugliest Manifestation on Campus", and a joke application for admission to MIT. The Milk was declared missing on August 20, 2022, and has yet to be found.

=== Simmons Hall ===
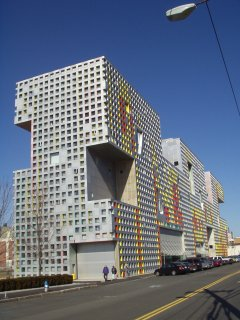
Simmons Hall, viewed from Briggs Field

Simmons Hall located at 229 Vassar Street, was designed by architect Steven Holl and dedicated in 2002. At the cost of $78.5 million, it is MIT's most expensive dormitory built on campus since Baker House.

The building is 382 feet (116 m) long and 10 stories tall, housing 344 undergraduate students. The structure is a large reinforced concrete block, perforated with approximately 5,500 square windows each measuring 2 feet (0.61 m) on a side, plus additional larger and irregularly shaped windows. An average single room has nine windows, each with its own small curtain. Internal design consists of one- and two-person rooms, plus lounges with and without kitchens. Rooms are roughly arranged into three towers (the "A", "B", and "C" towers). Simmons Hall has a dining hall and a late-night cafe. The building also has some more esoteric facilities, such as a large ball pit, an electronics makerspace, and a woodworking shop.

Many of the residents of Simmons complain that aesthetics came as a higher priority than functionality. For example, residents in the "A" tower must take two different elevators, or must walk the length of the building twice (more than an eighth of a mile) to reach the dining hall. Neither the "A" elevator nor "A" tower staircases reach the first floor, where the dining hall is located. Dormitory rooms are also equipped with custom-designed, modular furniture made of plywood. These furnishings usually have holes in them or are in the shape of cubes. Student opinions on the furnishings are mixed, with praise for their modularity and criticism for their excessive weight and lack of durability.

The building has been nicknamed "The Sponge", because the architect consciously modeled its shape and internal structure on a sea sponge. Opinions on the aesthetics of the building remain strongly divided. Simmons Hall won the 2003 American Institute of Architects Honor Award for Architecture, and the 2004 Harleston Parker Medal, administered by the Boston Society of Architects and awarded to the "most beautiful piece of architecture building, monument or structure" in the Boston area. Simmons Hall was featured in the exhibit Inside the Sponge—Students Take on MIT Simmons Hall at the Canadian Centre for Architecture in Montreal in the fall of 2006. On the other hand, the building has been criticized as being ugly, a sentiment echoed in James Kunstler's Eyesore of the Month catalog.

Within the building is a sculpture commissioned by American artist Dan Graham. Titled the Yin Yang Pavilion, it consists of a partially reflective, glass-walled, gravel-paved area in the shape of half of the yin-yang symbol in plan, while the other half contains a shallow pool of water.

== Former undergraduate dormitories ==
Some notable MIT undergraduate dormitories have been closed down after an extensive operating history. Bexley Hall was demolished due to concerns about structural integrity. Senior House was disbanded, with the building converted to a graduate student residence, after administrative controversies.

=== Bexley Hall ===
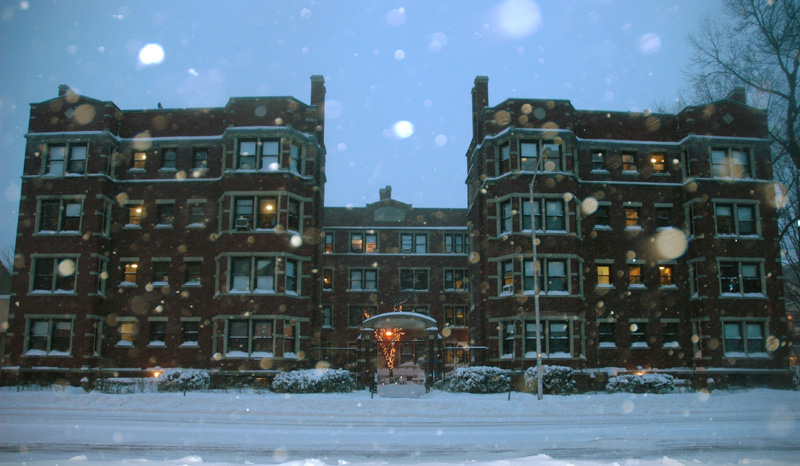
Bexley Hall during a snowy winter evening

Bexley Hall was an MIT dormitory located at 46-52 Massachusetts Avenue housing 120 undergrads. It was an early twentieth-century brick building, consisting of four four-story walkups surrounding a central courtyard. It was almost directly across the street from MIT's Building 7; old MIT official directories described it as being "just a stone's throw from the Institute's front door", while residents' description was "just a stoned throw from the Institute's front door." As former apartments which were renovated in the 1970s, Bexley suites had full kitchens and bathrooms. The stout, soundproof walls of Bexley were extensively painted by students and were plastered with murals and graffiti, some of which dated to the 1960s.

Long known for its alternative culture, Bexley was among the first MIT dormitories to become coed, but one of the last to officially become so. Some residents owned pet cats and allowed them to roam free around the building, decades before MIT officially adopted a cat-friendly policy in 2008. The May 1970 Grateful Dead concerts at MIT were sponsored by Bexley's housemaster.

Following leads in the phone hacking case of Cap'n Crunch, the Federal Bureau of Investigation visited Bexley in the early 1970s. Twenty to thirty Bexley residents filled a living room and were "interviewed" by two FBI agents. "We shared popcorn, and asked them more questions than they asked us; the spirit was boisterous."

On May 7, 2013, MIT announced that Bexley Hall would be closed for up to three years, due to significant water damage inside the building's exterior walls that rendered the dormitory unsafe to live in. Bexley residents and others expressed considerable concern about the sudden disruption of student housing plans, and possible loss of the unique student culture that had evolved over the years. On October 17, 2013, MIT's Department of Facilities recommended that Bexley be demolished, deeming it too expensive to repair and bring up to modern building code. By 2015, the building had been completely removed, and a small park established in its place.

Notable alumni of Bexley Hall include U.S. Senator Alex Padilla (D-CA); director of the Vatican Observatory Br. Guy Consolmagno; co-inventor of the computerized spreadsheet, Dan Bricklin; best-selling author and neuroscientist Daniel Levitin; Jeff Sagarin, a sports computerized ratings guru; and former NASA Planetary Protection Officer Catharine Conley. Institute Professor Jerome Lettvin and his wife Maggie were Bexley "houseparents" in the 1970s and early 1980s.

=== Senior House ===
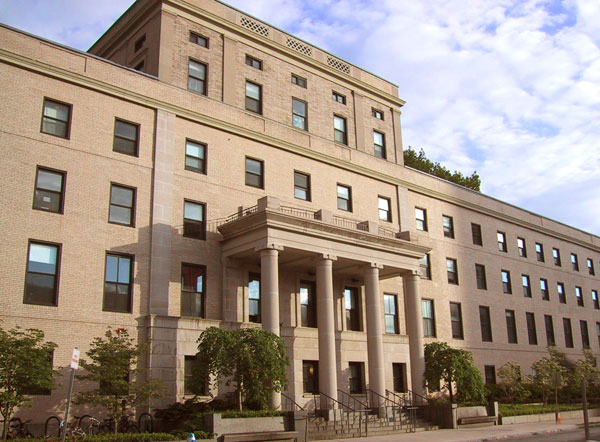
Senior House entrance on Amherst Street

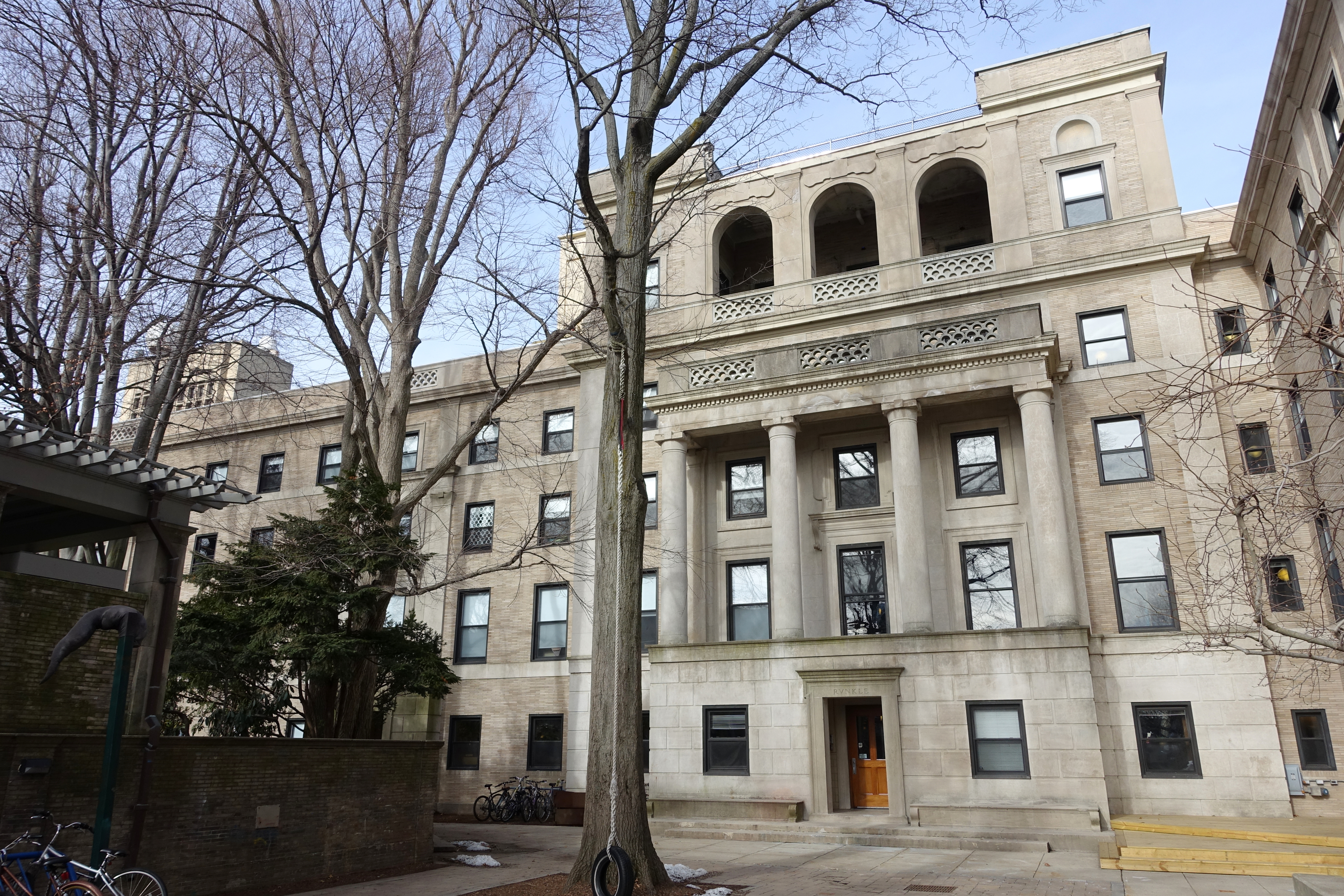
Inward-facing traditional entrance to Senior House

Senior House is the oldest dormitory at MIT and was the first self-governing college dormitory in the United States. Since its construction in 1916, it has served as the institute's first dormitory and on-campus fraternity, a mixed undergraduate and graduate dormitory, an all-graduate facility, a seniors' dormitory, and military housing during World War II. The L-shaped building is directly adjacent to the residence of the President of MIT. A tower at the center of the north side features neo-classical columns that reflect the architecture of the original MIT Cambridge campus.

The building's street address is 4 Ames Street, but the mailing address is 70 Amherst Street, because the main entry was moved to what originally was the back of the building. Before implementation of a single-entry building layout, Senior House had six entries named after historical MIT figures:

- Ware (William R. Ware, professor of architecture)
- Atkinson (William P. Atkinson, professor of English language and literature)
- Runkle (John Daniel Runkle, second president of MIT)
- Holman (Silas W. Holman, professor of physics)
- Nichols (William Ripley Nichols, professor of chemistry)
- Crafts (James Crafts, fourth president of MIT).

Citing a low graduation rate and possible drug-related problems in Senior House, MIT administrators implemented a "turnaround program" in 2016 that included the banning of new students and the implementation of changes related to mental health and supervision. On June 12, 2017, it was announced that Senior House would be replaced with "Pilot 2021", a program to house mostly first-year students in a more regulated environment. The residence would no longer allow cats, murals, or other elements connected with "East-side" dormitory culture. Many members of the East-side MIT community viewed the erasing of Senior House culture as an attack from the administration on their community values.

Facing student resistance towards Pilot 2021, MIT announced on July 7, 2017, that the building would be completely emptied of undergraduates and repurposed as a graduate student dormitory. This announcement triggered a new round of controversy and discussion among the MIT community. An article in Wired described the MIT dormitory closure as part of a wider trend among American universities of emphasizing safety and orderliness while minimizing legal liability and bad publicity.

Notable alumni of Senior House include:

- Patrick Collison (no degree, 2010), co-founder and CEO of Stripe also known for becoming the world's youngest self-made billionaire at age 28;
- Leslie Dewan (Mechanical Engineering and Nuclear Engineering, 2007), co-founder and CEO of Transatomic Power and RadiantNano, former member of the MIT Corporation, named a Young Global Leader by the World Economic Forum.
- Br. Robert J. Macke, S.J. (Physics, 1996), Curator of the Vatican Meteorite Collection;
- Deepto Chakrabarty (Physics, 1988), Head of the MIT Department of Physics, awarded the Bruno Rossi Prize for his pioneering work on understanding the exotic environment around fast-spinning neutron stars;
- Aprille Ericsson (Aerospace Engineering, 1986), first Assistant Secretary of Defense for Science and Technology;
- Elizabeth Bradley (Electrical Engineering, 1983), applied mathematician, computer scientist and former Olympic rower;
- Barry Nalebuff (Economics and Math, 1980), Yale Professor, co-founder of Honest Tea, business columnist, and author of many books including Thinking Strategically and The Art of Strategy;
- Janos Pasztor (Nuclear Engineering, 1979), a Hungarian diplomat and former Assistant Secretary-General of the United Nations;
- John Brusger (Chemistry, 1978) founder of Newbury Comics;
- Lawrence Summers (Economics, 1975), former president of Harvard University and former Secretary of the Treasury during the Clinton Administration;
- Adrian Bejan (Mechanical Engineering, 1971), eponym of the Bejan number also known for his formulation of constructal theory, which predicts natural design and its evolution in engineering, scientific, and social systems.
- Bruce Morrison (Chemistry, 1965), United States Representative for the 3rd Congressional District of Connecticut, 1983–1991;
- Robert Weinberg (Biology, 1964), Daniel K. Ludwig Professor for Cancer Research at MIT, awarded the National Medal of Science and the Breakthrough Prize in Life Sciences for his contribution to the identification of cellular oncogenes and their role in cancer;
- John Banzhaf (Electrical Engineering, 1962), public interest lawyer and professor at the George Washington University Law School. He obtained the first copyright ever registered on a computer program, successfully lobbied Congress to amend the copyright statute to include data processing, developed the Banzhaf Power Index for determining voting power in complex voting situations, and founded the anti-smoking advocacy group Action on Smoking and Health.
- Ralph Wanger (Management, 1955), known as one of the world's greatest investors and author of A Zebra In Lion Country. From 1970 to 2003, Wanger grew the Acorn Fund from $8 million to $7.5 billion while generating average annual returns of 16.3% making it the best-performing small-cap and growth fund of the era. US portfolio managers voted Wanger as their top choice to manage their own money, surpassing Warren Buffett who came in second.
- Clark C. Abt (General Engineering, 1951) founder of Abt Associates also known for first formalizing the concept and usages of serious games;
- Moshe Arens (Mechanical Engineering, 1947), former member of the Israeli Knesset, Minister of Defense, and Ambassador to the United States;
- Gordon S. Brown (Electrical Engineering, 1931), former Dean of Engineering at MIT and a pioneer in the development of automatic-feedback systems and numerically controlled machine tools.

Notable faculty residents of Senior House include:

- Agustin Fierro Rayo (Linguistics & Philosophy, PhD 2001), MIT Professor of Philosophy and Dean of the MIT School of Humanities, Arts, and Social Sciences;
- Henry Jenkins, media researcher and co-founder of the Comparative Media Studies program at MIT;
- Paula T. Hammond (Chemical Engineering, 1984), MIT Institute Professor and Dean of the MIT School of Engineering, Fellow of the American Academy of Arts and Sciences and all three United States National academies, and a member of the President Biden's Council of Advisors on Science and Technology, known for development of innovative methods to create novel materials one molecular layer at a time and for applying these materials to areas ranging from drug delivery to energy storage;
- Ernst Levy, Swiss musicologist, composer, pianist and conductor
- John B. Goodenough, awarded the 2019 Nobel Prize in Chemistry for the development of the lithium-ion battery, was the faculty resident in Senior House when he was part of an interdisciplinary team that developed random access memory.

== FSILGs ==
Fraternities, sororities, and independent living groups are approved MIT undergraduate housing except for first-year students. They are independently owned by corporations composed mostly of alumni, operated by resident students. MIT participates in the municipal licensing process, and requires a graduate resident tutor in each group. Dining arrangements vary from a hired chef to rotating cooking duties to food provided for self-cooking.

=== Independent Living Groups ===
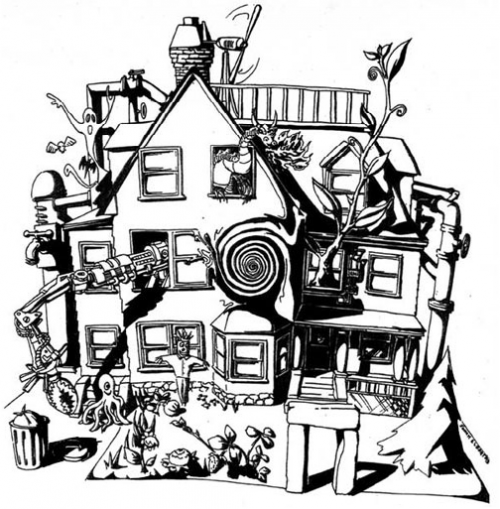
Home of pika: A Continuing Experiment in Cooperative Living

MIT's Independent Living Groups, or ILGs, participate in some of the broader Greek events, but maintain many of their traditions as cooperative homes. Some developed as fraternities that left their national associations during the early 1970s as part of a move toward co-education, which was not compatible with their national organizations. MIT's five ILGs coordinate themselves through a separate Living Group Council (LGC). Each ILG property is owned by a corporation populated mainly or entirely by alumni and then leased to residents.

Following are MIT's ILGs. Active:

- Student House, 1930, co-ed (Note: Student House formed with the help of an anonymous donor in 1930. As of 1940, the address is 111 Bay State Road, Boston, Massachusetts. Co-educational in 1969.)
- Fenway House, 1973, co-ed (Note: What is now Fenway House was a chapter of ΣΑΜ between 1917 and 73. It went co-ed in 1970, leading to the split. The address is 34 The Fenway, Boston, Massachusetts.)
- ΕΘ - Epsilon Theta, 1974, co-ed (Note: Called "Epsilon Theta", the "Thetans" or just "ET", this group was the ΕΘ chapter of ΣΝ from 1925-74, which was later re-established on campus. It went co-ed in 1970, leading to the split. The address is 259 St. Paul Street, Brookline, Massachusetts.)
- Women's Independent Living Group, 1976, women's (Note: WILG is located at 355 Massachusetts Ave., Cambridge, MA. It is women-only.)
- pika 1981, co-ed (Note: Pika was a chapter of ΠΚΑ between 1969-81. The address is 69 Chestnut Street, Cambridge, Massachusetts. Went co-ed in 1975, leading to the split with ΠΚΑ.)

Inactive:

- 5:15 Club, 1933–1986 (Note: The 5:15 Club was organized to serve commuters, but later became residential as an ILG, had been housed at 311 Memorial Drive, Cambridge, Massachusetts.)

== Graduate dormitories ==
MIT graduate dormitories include the following:

- 70 Amherst Street (E2, formerly undergraduate Senior House)
- Ashdown House (NW35, 235 Albany Street)
- Edgerton House (NW10, 143 Albany Street)
- Graduate Tower at Site 4 (E37, 45 Hayward Street)
- Sidney-Pacific (NW86, 70 Pacific Street)
- Tang Hall (W84, 550 Memorial Drive)
- The Warehouse (NW30, 224 Albany Street)
- Westgate Apartments (W85, 540 Memorial Drive)

MIT also has a partnership with American Campus Communities to operate an additional graduate dorm on campus:

- Graduate Junction (W87 and W88, 269 and 299 Vassar Street)
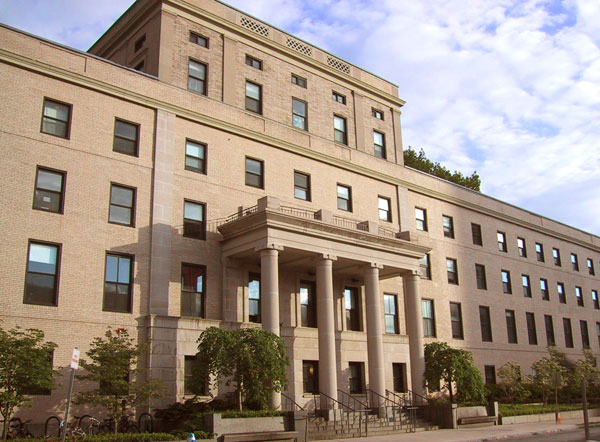
70 Amherst Street

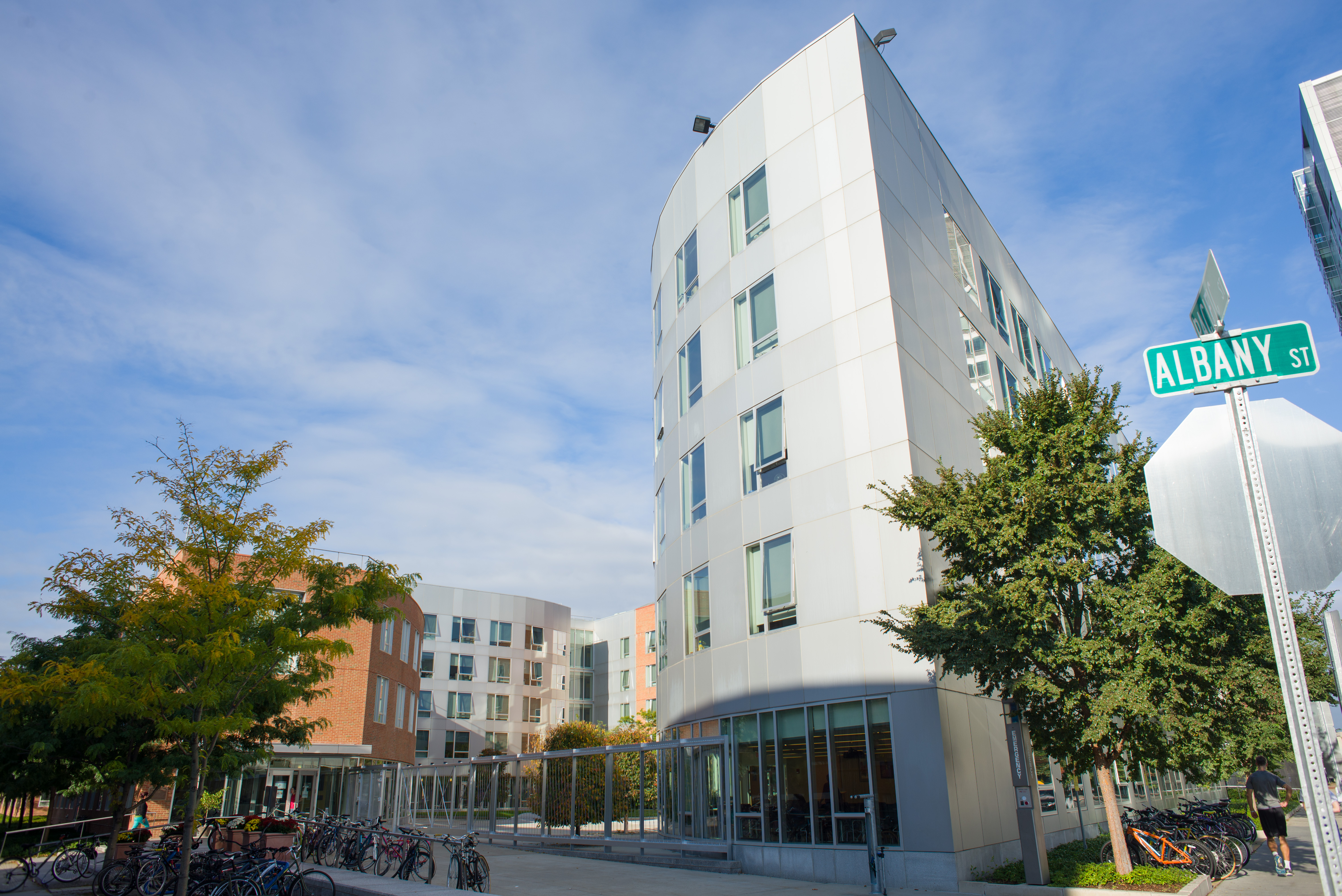
Ashdown House

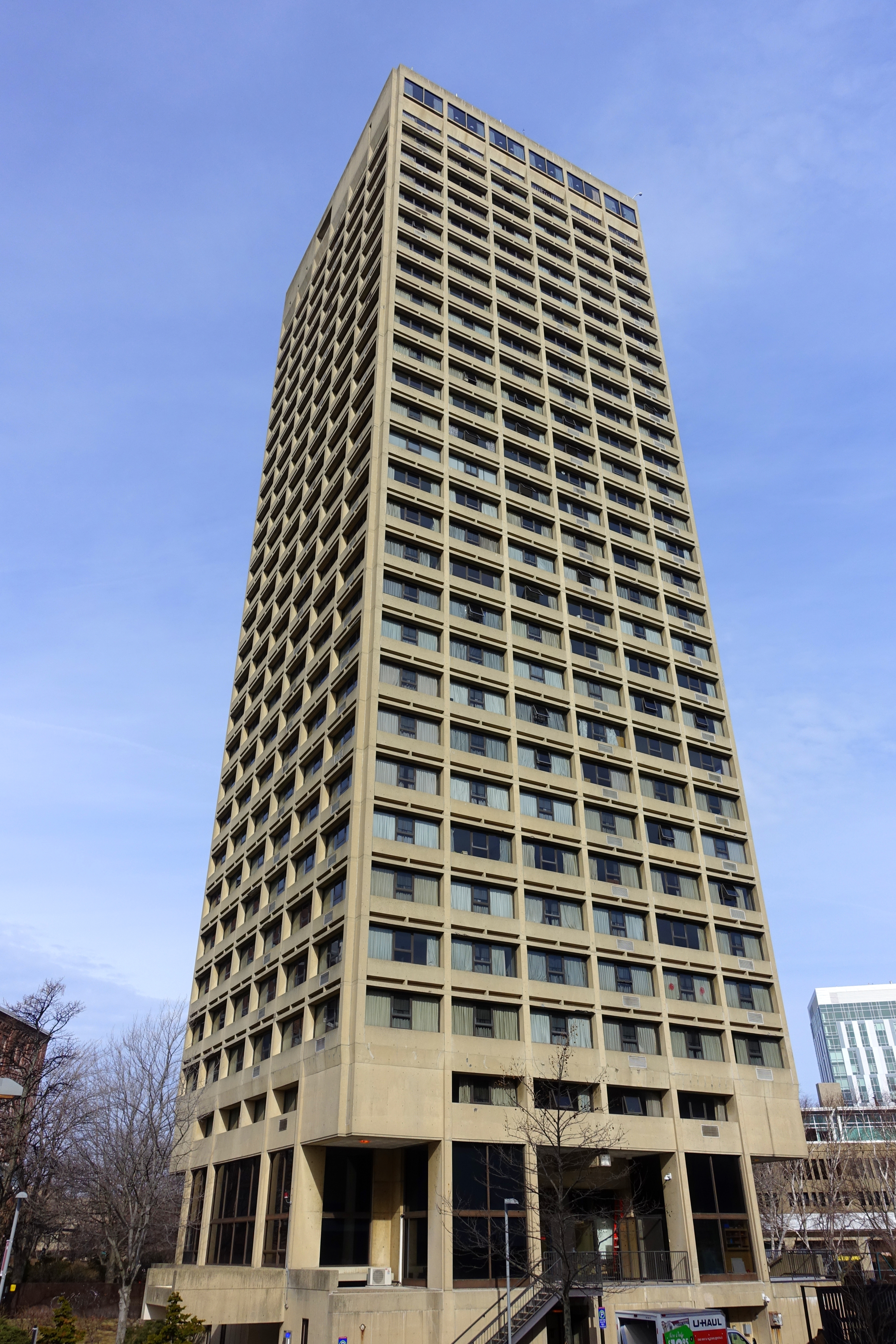
Eastgate Apartments (demolished c. 2022)

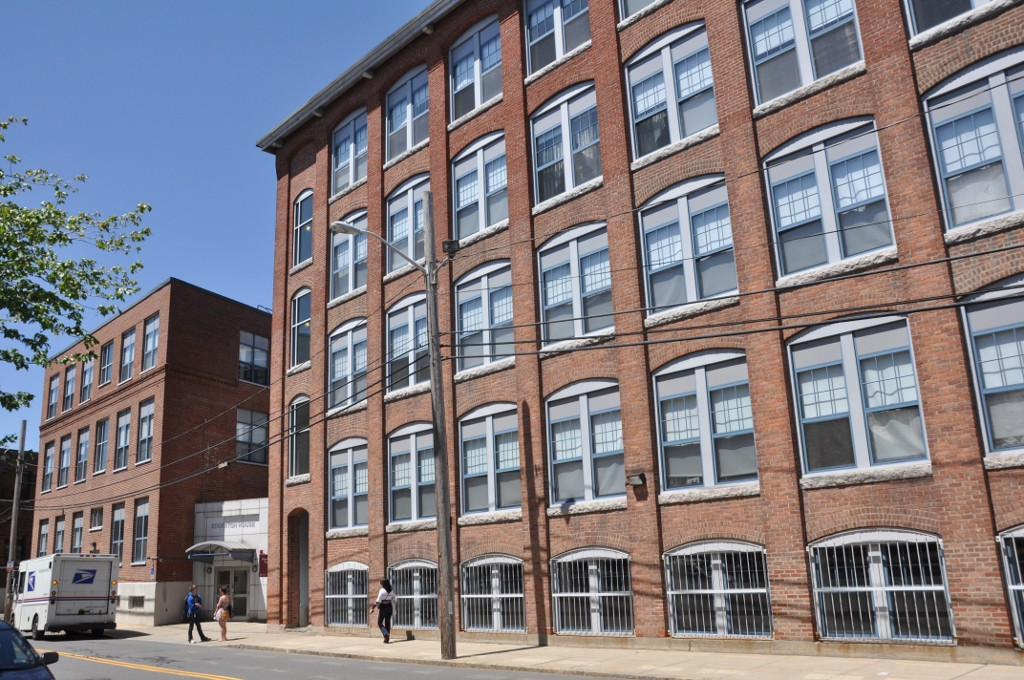
Edgerton House

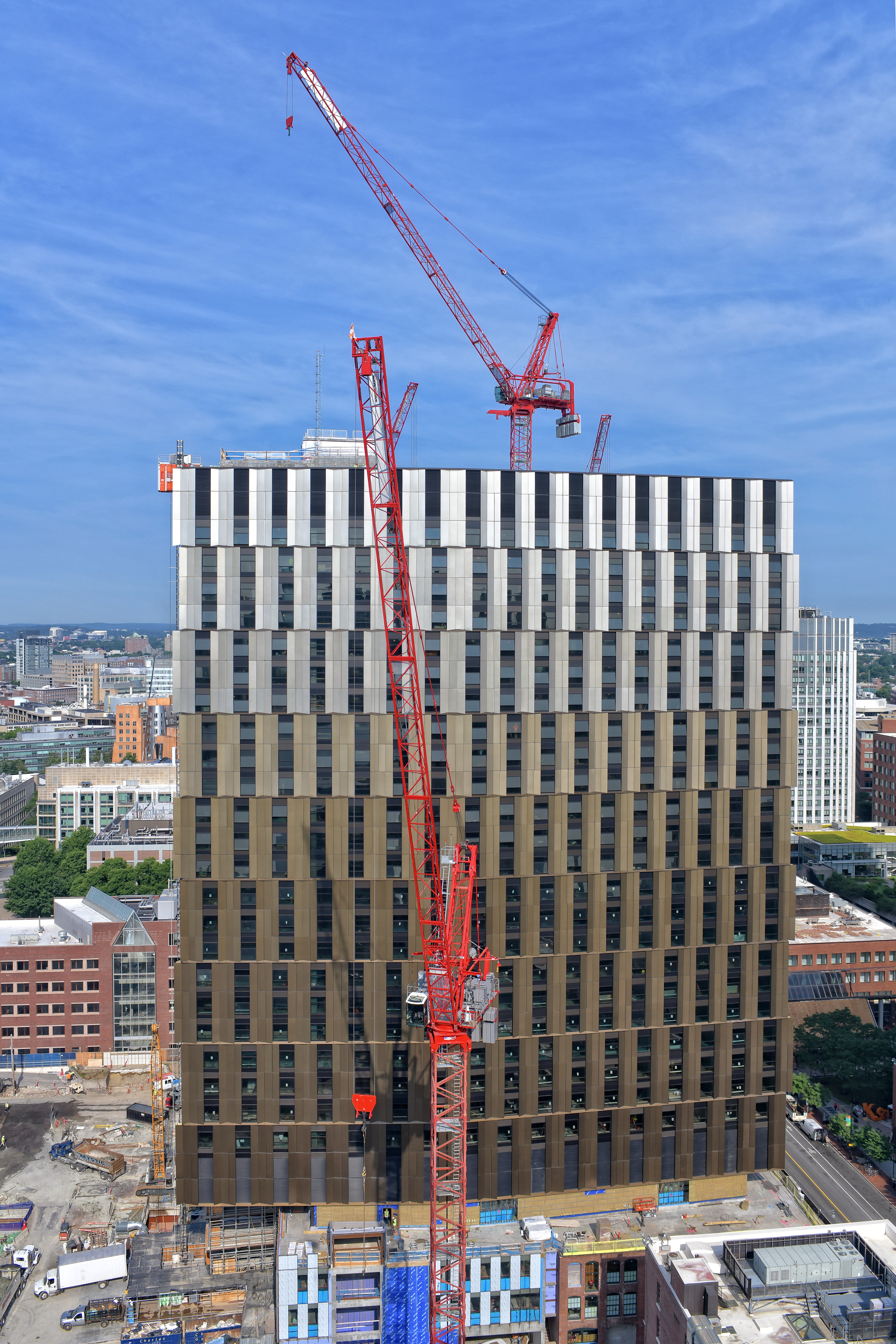
Site 4 tower construction, July 2019

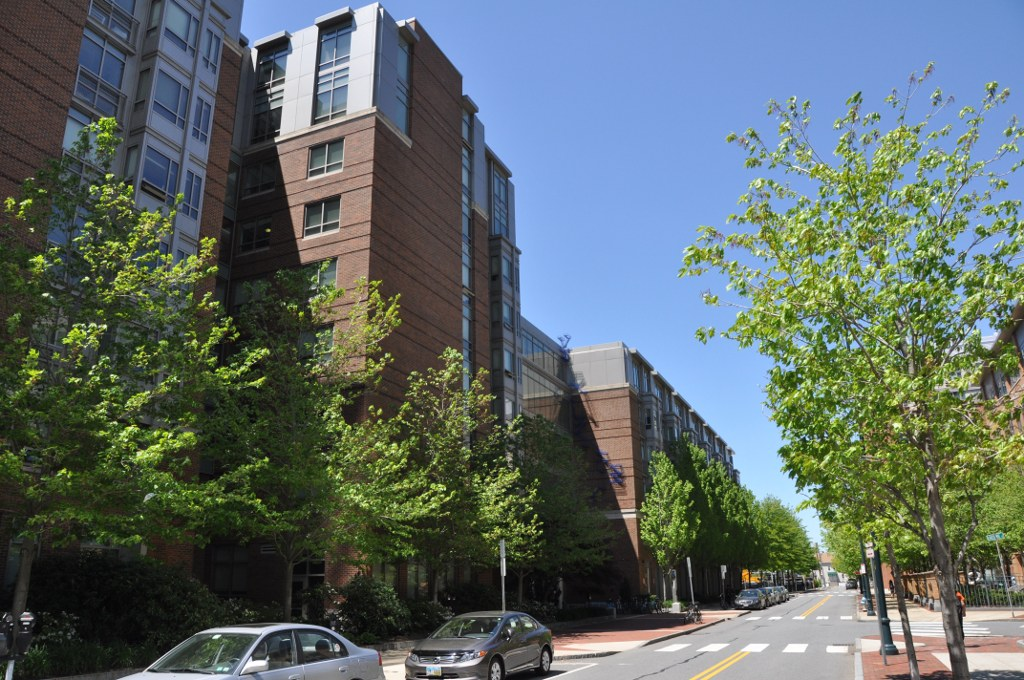
Sidney-Pacific

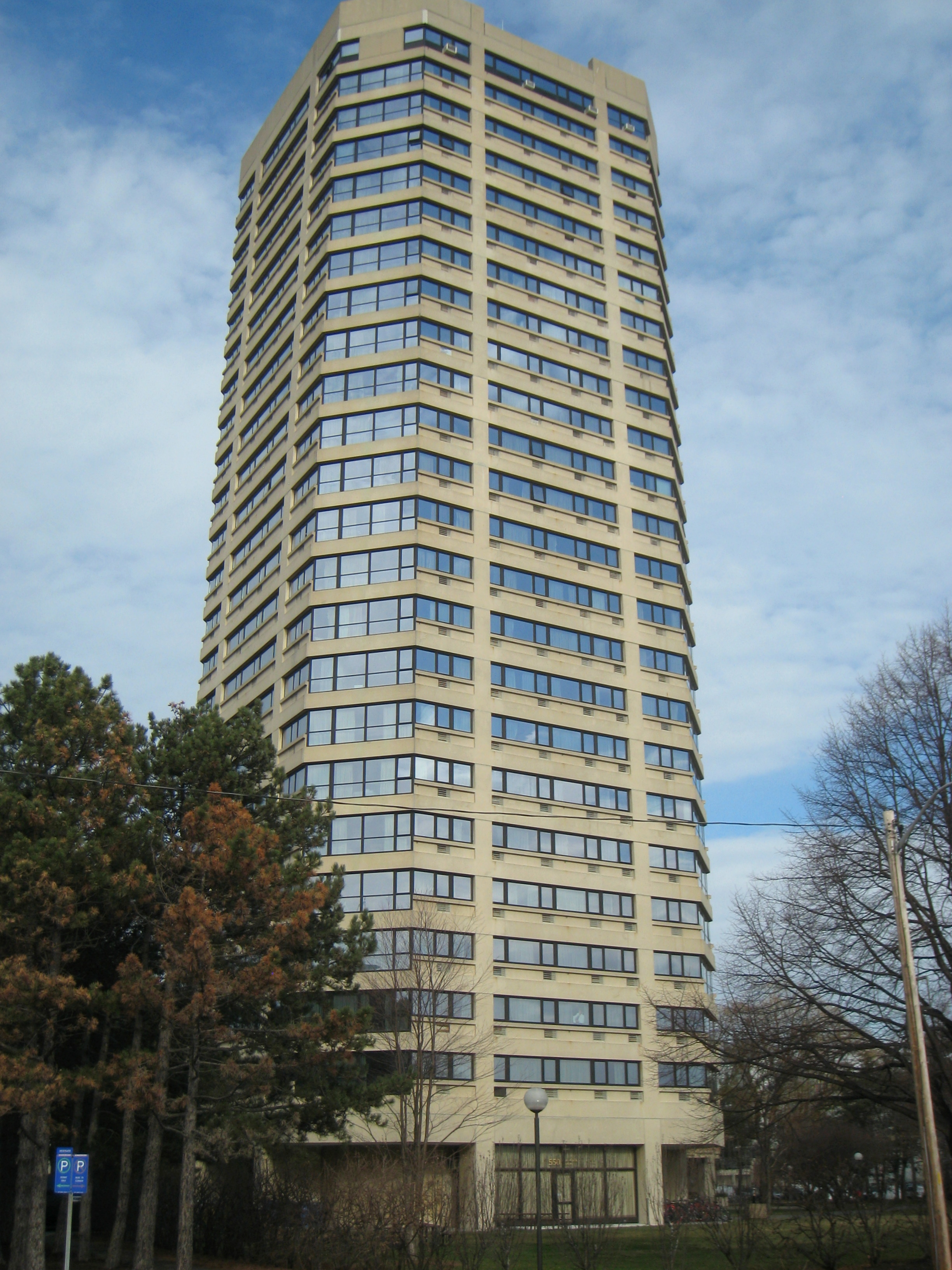
Tang Hall

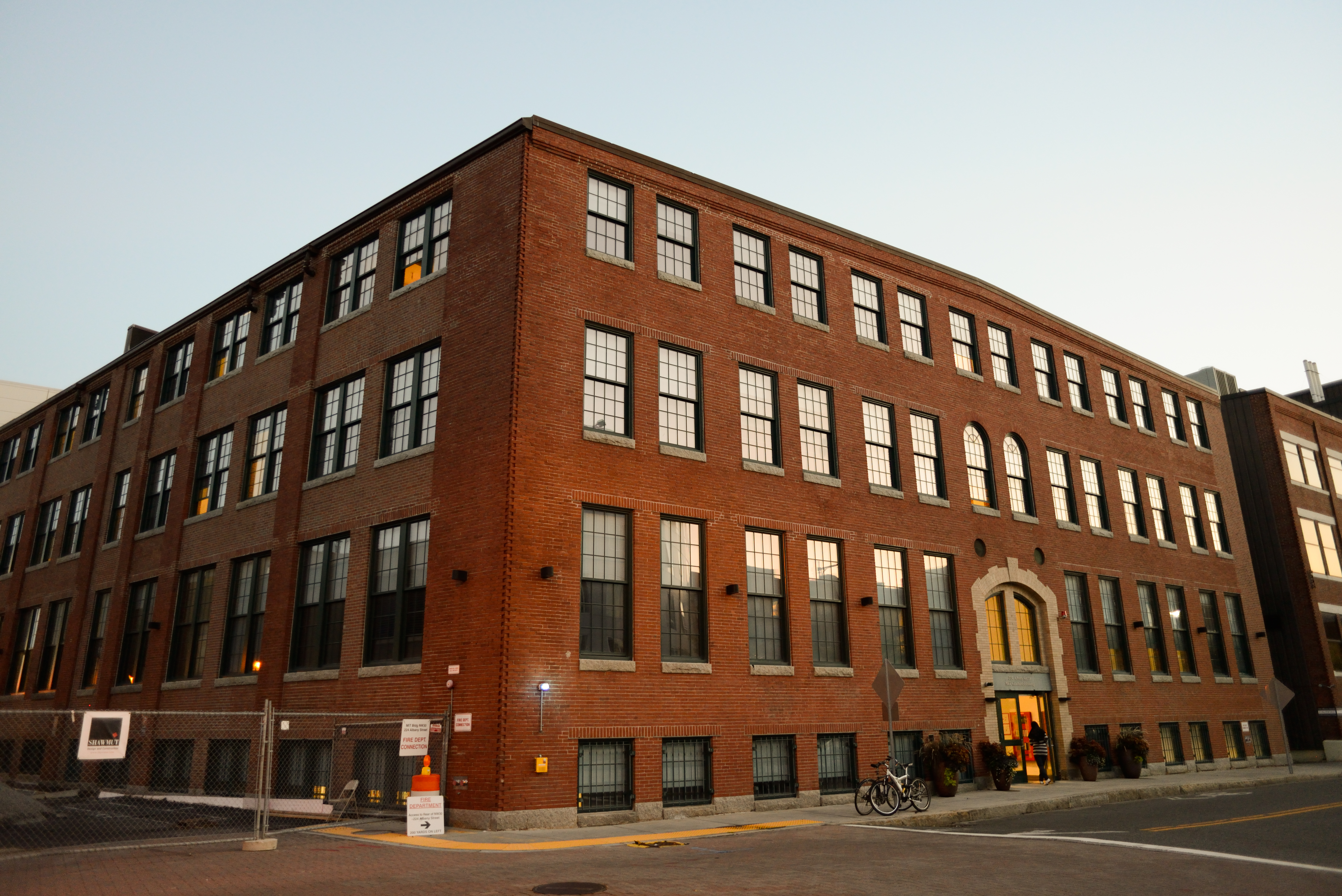
The Warehouse

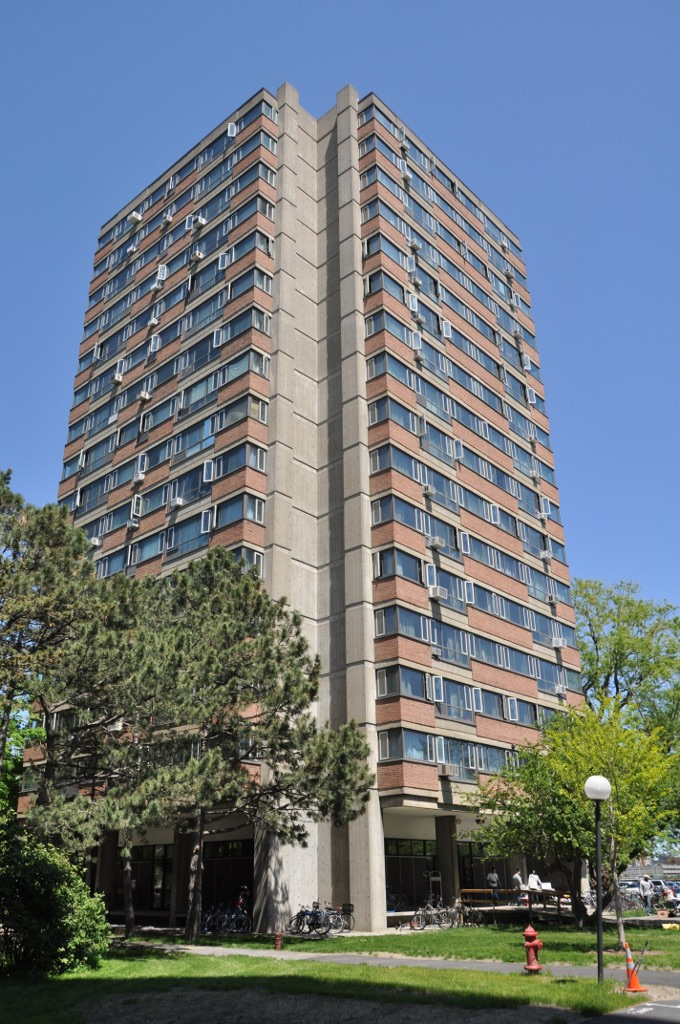
Westgate Apartments

== Former graduate dormitories ==
- The building at 305 Memorial Drive was formerly called "Ashdown House", but has been converted into "Maseeh Hall" for undergraduates. The name "Ashdown House" has been reassigned to the graduate residence at 235 Albany Street.
- Eastgate Apartments (demolished c. 2022, to make room for a new building in Kendall Square)
- Green Hall (350 Memorial Drive, renamed as KAT House in 2008). This was a women's single-sex graduate dormitory at MIT from the mid-1980s, and had a mix of doubles and singles.

== See also ==
- Campus of the Massachusetts Institute of Technology
- Traditions and student activities at MIT
