= Leary–Lettvin debate =

1967 debate on the merits and dangers of LSD

The Leary–Lettvin debate was a May 3, 1967 debate between Jerome Lettvin, a medical doctor and professor at MIT, and Timothy Leary, a licensed psychologist, about the merits and dangers of the psychedelic drug LSD. It took place in the Kresge Auditorium at the Massachusetts Institute of Technology. The debate attracted a great deal of media attention at the time and was shown in school anti-drug programs.

== Participants ==
=== Timothy Leary's credentials ===
Timothy Leary focused on how the interpersonal process might be used to diagnose disorders and patterns found in human personalities. He proposed that psychedelic substances, used at proper dosages in an appropriate setting could, under the guidance of psychologists, alter behavior in beneficial ways not easily attainable through regular therapy. Subsequently, he had developed a following for his turn on, tune in, drop out philosophy which was commonly understood to suggest that taking psychedelic drugs (in particular LSD) was valuable to average people.

=== Jerome Lettvin's credentials ===
Trained by neurologist Denny Brown, Jerome Lettvin was a psychiatrist, neurologist, neurosurgeon, and neuroscientist and was an advocate of individual rights. Having been the head of 7 doctors controlling the 7,000 patients in Manteno State Hospital, he had experience diagnosing a large number of neurological conditions along with their treatments, drugs, and their effectiveness.

== Venue and preliminaries ==
Leary was scheduled to debate another MIT professor at Kresge Auditorium on the MIT campus. On the day of the debate, the scheduled professor bowed out, leaving the organizers scrambling to find another professor who would take his place. Lettvin was considered a poor candidate because of his lack of conventionality and for his regular advocacy on behalf of students. The organizers exhausted all other candidates and then came to Lettvin's laboratory in Building 20 to plead for a last minute appearance. From the middle of an experiment on a frog's optic nerve, in his shirt sleeves, he was offered a tie to wear and went to Kresge for the debate with no preparation.

== Issue and debate ==
Leary proposed the sacramental use of psychedelic drugs. Much of his presentation was devoted to arguing for the necessity of scientifically studying the effects of drugs such as LSD and marijuana in order to determine the contexts in which they might be useful, and those in which they would not. In addition, Leary made a plea for the equal importance of scientifically studying the "inner world" - the world of the mind - as well as the "outer world" of material reality. The U.S. government had made the use of these and some other drugs illegal. Lettvin was asked by the MIT organizers to respond to Leary.

The debate was televised by WGBH-TV Channel 2 in 1967. Leary went first in "High Priest" mode, presenting barefoot with a multimedia projected visual backdrop. His presentation made the use of drugs appear very appealing to students in the audience, and they responded positively. Lettvin admitted that Leary's arguments were very seductive.

With humor and without losing the audience, Lettvin followed with an appeal on behalf of the "higher" mental functions using textbook and clinical observations as support material. He also accepted many of Leary's points, arguing against the prohibition of marijuana and other drugs. He argued instead that persuasion rather than coercion should be the focus of drug policy. Lettvin criticized the U.S. government for ill-conceived anti-drug legislation.

Lettvin asserted that psilocybin causes cognitive impairment that persists long after the acute effects of the drug have passed, based on anecdotal evidence. Lettvin spoke subjectively, framing the decision to use drugs as a personal one, not a scientific one. He spoke of "good" and "evil" and the "devil". Lettvin told the audience that he "felt sick" for Leary.

Perhaps the most famous part of the debate was when Lettvin responded "bullshit!" to Leary's claim that he would diagnose the frank symptoms of temporal lobe epilepsy as those of a visionary mystic.
