= Women's Independent Living Group =

Massachusetts Institute of Technology student group

- Student society
- Massachusetts Institute of Technology
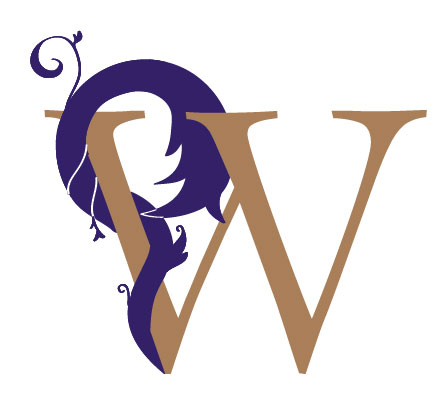
- Location: 355 Massachusetts Avenue; Cambridge, Massachusetts
- Abbreviation: WILG
- Established: 1976
- Website: wilg.mit.edu

The Women's Independent Living Group (WILG) is one of five independent living groups at the Massachusetts Institute of Technology. It is situated along Massachusetts Avenue in Central Square, Cambridge and consists of five floors of residential areas, kitchens, and student lounges. It houses about 45 female students.

== Structure ==
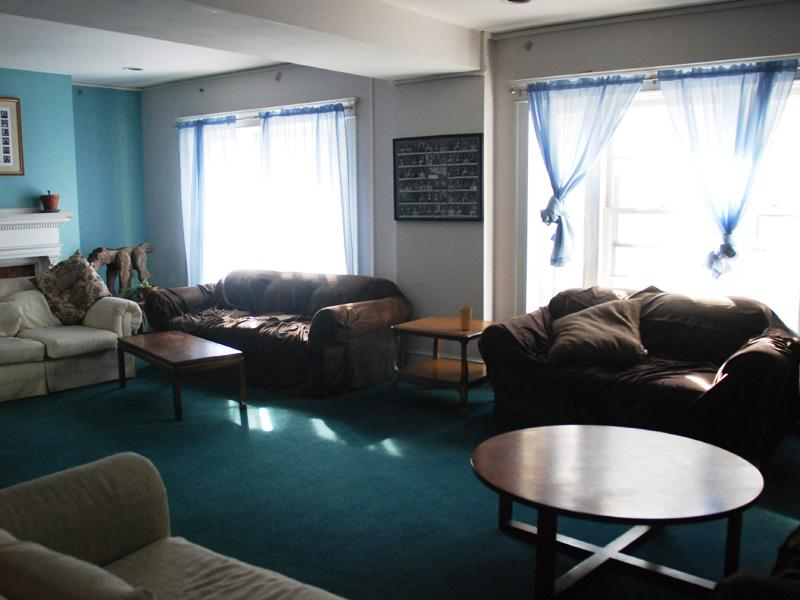
Women's Independent Living Group's second floor lounge

The house consists of two entryways leading to five floors of single and double bedrooms for approximately 45 students. The house also hosts a main dining room, four lounges on various floors, a music room, an exercise room, a library, a Graduate Resident Assistant (GRA) suite, two kitchens, a computer room, a guest room, and other common spaces.

The basement houses laundry machines, storage space, and machinery for renovations. Additionally, the back entryway leads to a parking space and areas for bike racks. The building itself is connected structurally to the MIT Alpha Delta Phi (ADP) fraternity, which shares a balcony with the house. The house is run by an executive government, with advice from the WILG Alumnae Corporation.

== History ==
The Women's Independent Living Group (WILG) was founded in 1976 by Kate Hendricks 1971, Dorothy L. Bowe 1984, Marjorie Pierce, Elisabeth Drake 1958, former assistant dean for student affairs Nancy Wheatley 1971, Zaurie Zimmerman 1977, and former dean of the graduate school Ken Wadleigh.

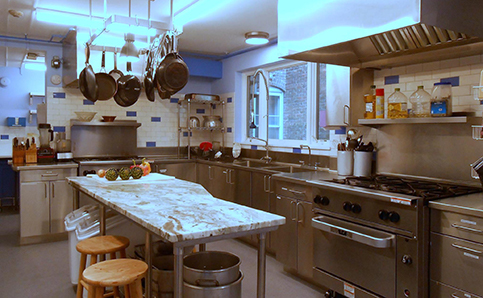
Women's Independent Living Group's first floor kitchen

the 1960s, several sororities at MIT approached coed living groups about starting a chapter on campus. A small group of students approached the Association of MIT Alumnae (AMITA) about the possibility of an all-women's living group. At the time, while there were places for women to live on and off campus, including McCormick, a female-only dorm, and several co-ed fraternities and dorms, there was no cooperative living group for females.

The population of female students on campus was also beginning to overcrowd McCormick, so Dean Wadleigh, proposed using a building at 351-355 Massachusetts Avenue as the location for the new living group. The building was MIT-controlled, although owned independently by Northgate Corporation and being used as an apartment providing off-campus housing to MIT affiliates. Because the building was deemed too large for one living group, half was allotted to Alpha Delta Phi (ADP), then a new fraternity forming on campus.

While 355 Massachusetts Avenue was being renovated, both the women's living group and the fraternity shared the living space in 351. The first floor was built with a ramp instead of stairs for the back door to ensure at least one handicapped-accessible floor. In 1976, the independent living group had its first entry in the Undergraduate Residence Book, distributed to incoming freshmen to help them choose their living arrangement for the year. In the 1976–1977 school year, ten women and six freshmen joined the house, alongside four transfer students.

Founders Lowe, Drake, Pierce, and Hendricks formed the WILG Alumnae Corporation to advise the house. In 1982, the Women's Independent Living Group residence was renamed the Marjorie Pierce House.

== Symbols ==
The WILG logo was redesigned in 2009 by Clare Bayley 2011, consisting of a large ornamental "W" used as an identifier. The font choice was inspired by serif font faces, with purple curlicues wrapped around the outer edge of the dark bronze letter.

== Notable alumni ==
- Farah Alibay 2013, NASA systems engineer
- Donna Baranski-Walker 1981, founder of The Rebuilding Alliance
- Karen Gleason 1982, assistant provost at the Massachusetts Institute of Technology
- Laura L. Kiessling 1983, Novartis professor of chemistry at Massachusetts Institute of Technology
- Marjorie Pierce 2022, architect
- Megan Smith 1986 MEng 1988, Chief Technology Officer of the United States
- Heidemarie Stefanyshyn-Piper 1984, astronaut

== See also ==
- Housing at the Massachusetts Institute of Technology
- List of Massachusetts Institute of Technology fraternities and sororities
