= Maggie Lettvin =

American writer

Maggie B. Lettvin
- Born: March 15, 1927 (age 99); Philadelphia, PA
- Occupations: writer and promoter of health and exercise
- Writing career
- Language: English
- Subject: Health

Margaret B. Lettvin is an American writer and promoter of exercise and health. She was known in the Boston area in the 1970s for a PBS television show on WGBH-TV called Maggie and The Beautiful Machine, and a book based on the show. After a serious car accident, she developed a set of exercises for back pain, which became Maggie's Back Book (ISBN 0395251478).

She is the widow of MIT Professor Emeritus Jerome Lettvin, with whom she served as houseparent of the MIT Bexley dorm. They had three children: David, Ruth, and Jonathan.

== Books ==
- Lettvin, Maggie (1974). The Beautiful Machine. New York: Ballantine Books. ISBN 0-345242-53-X.
- Lettvin, Maggie (1976). Maggie's Back Book: Healing the Hurt in Your Lower Back. Boston: Houghton Mifflin. ISBN 0-395248-98-1.
- Lettvin, Maggie (1980). Maggie's Woman's Book: Her Personal Plan for Health and Fitness for Women of Every Age. Boston: Houghton Mifflin. ISBN 0-395294-72-X.
- Lettvin, Maggie (1987). Maggie's Food Strategy Book: Taking Charge of Your Diet for Lifelong Health and Vitality. Boston: Houghton Mifflin. ISBN 0-395379-83-0.
