= Manteno State Hospital =

- Shown in Manteno, Illinois

Geography
- Location: Manteno, Kankakee County, Illinois, United States
- Coordinates: 41°13′57″N 87°48′17″W

Organization
- Care system: Public
- Type: Specialist

Services
- Emergency department: None
- Speciality: Psychiatric hospital

History
- Founded: December 1930
- Closed: December 31, 1985

Links
- Lists: Hospitals in Illinois

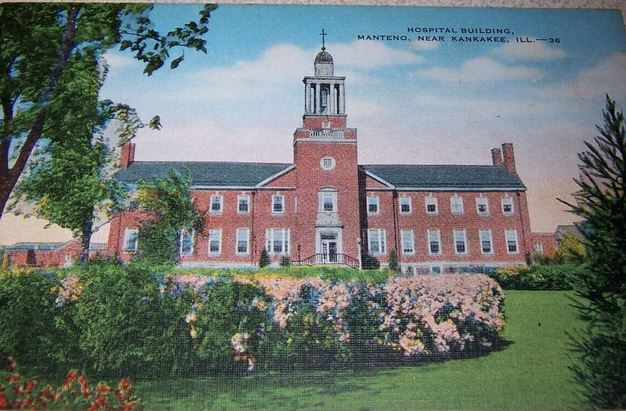
Manteno State Hospital Postcard 1936

Manteno State Hospital (formerly Manteno State Mental Hospital) was a psychiatric hospital located in rural Manteno Township in Kankakee County, Illinois.

== Founding ==
The facility was authorized in 1927 by the 55th Illinois General Assembly with its first patients arriving in December 1930. By 1936, the hospital spanned 1200 acres, including livestock and farming spaces that were used by patients for farming therapy, a fire department, restaurants, and police.

The facility was nearly self-sustaining, with its own power plant generating the electricity needed to run the hospital. The steam from these powerplants was also used to generate hot water used for laundry and showering across the whole hospital.

In 1954, the patient population peaked at 8,195. In 1983, the facility was authorized for closure by Governor James R. Thompson and closed on December 31, 1985.

== History ==
The hospital experienced a Typhoid fever outbreak for six months in 1939. This outbreak resulted in the deaths of 37 patients, hundreds sick, and 45 cases of runaways. It was suspected that contaminated water had leaked into the hospital's water supply.

In 1953, a short film called Working and Playing to Health, directed by Willard Van Dyke, was created with support from the Illinois Department of Public Welfare and the Mental Health Film Board. It dramatizes the different therapy programs available at the hospital and received a Golden Reel Award from the American Film Assembly in 1954.

In October 1986, the Illinois Veterans home at Manteno was dedicated and still operates on a portion of the grounds of the original psychiatric facility while numerous other building have been demolished. There are very few buildings left; for example, the Morgan Cottage is left along with the sewage plant. These buildings are abandoned but left in original condition. Many other buildings have been renovated for other uses as of July 2009. The site was redeveloped as a VA home, an industrial park, and a portion of the grounds is now the Manteno Municipal golf course. A state hospital cemetery is to the east of the site. The grounds are the now the home of numerous housing developments including a residential treatment center for males and females ages 12 to 21 called Indian Oaks Academy, which is a member of the Nexus family of treatment programs.

== See also ==
- List of Veterans Affairs medical facilities
- Jerome Y. Lettvin, head psychiatrist circa 1950
