= Leslie Dewan =

American nuclear engineer

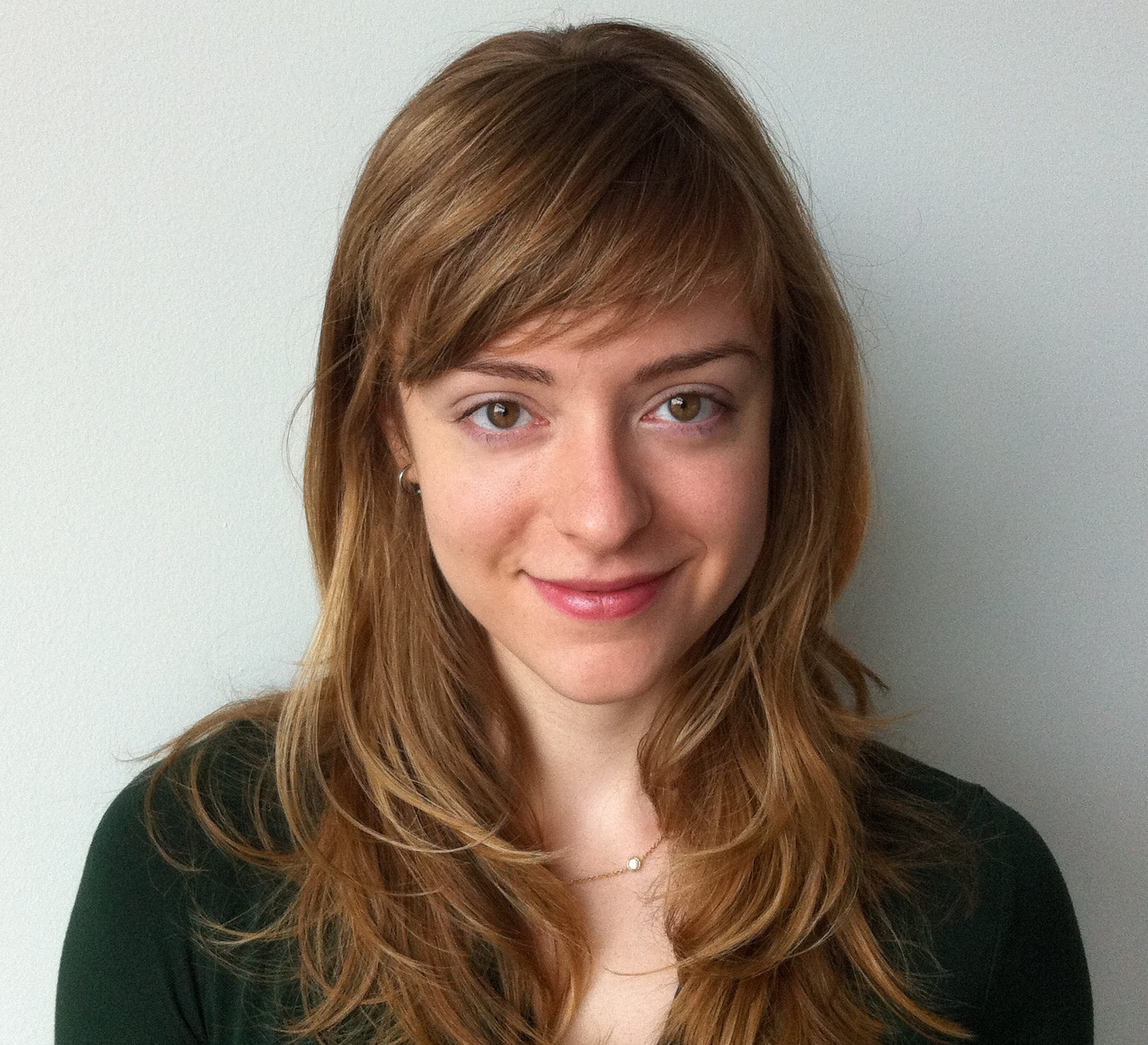
- Leslie Dewan in 2012
- Born: November 27, 1984 (age 41); Newton, Massachusetts
- Education: Massachusetts Institute of Technology
- Employer: Transatomic Power
- Awards: World Economic Forum "Young Global Leaders" in 2016; National Geographic "Emerging Explorers" in 2015; TIME Magazine "30 People Under 30 Changing the World" in 2013; MIT Technology Review “35 Innovators Under 35” in 2013; Forbes Magazine “30 Under 30” in Energy in 2012

Leslie Dewan (born November 27, 1984) is an American nuclear engineer. She was the co-founder and chief executive officer of Transatomic Power. Dewan was a member of the board of MIT and was named a Young Global Leader by the World Economic Forum.

== Education ==
Dewan is a 2002 graduate of The Winsor School in Boston, Massachusetts. She received S.B. degrees from the Massachusetts Institute of Technology in mechanical engineering and nuclear engineering in 2007. She received her Ph.D. in nuclear engineering from MIT in 2013. While at MIT, Dewan was awarded a Department of Energy Computational Science Graduate Fellowship and an MIT Presidential Fellowship.

== Entrepreneurship ==
Dewan co-founded Transatomic Power in Cambridge, Massachusetts in 2011 and was the chief executive officer until the corporation ceased operations. Transatomic Power was founded to design and develop a molten salt reactor (Generation IV reactor) to generate clean and low-cost nuclear power. In December 2012, Forbes magazine selected Dewan for their 30 Under 30 in Energy. In September 2013, MIT Technology Review recognized Dewan as one of “35 Innovators Under 35”. In December 2013, TIME magazine selected Dewan as one of "30 People Under 30 Changing the World". In 2016, errors were discovered in the company's analysis of its reactor design. A corrected reactor design had substantial technical advances over conventional light water reactors. However, it did not meet commercial requirements for rapid growth of the company. By September 25, 2018, Transatomic had ceased operations and placed its design data in the public domain.

Dewan is currently CEO at RadiantNano in Framingham, Massachusetts, in partnership with Dr. Matthew Alpert, designing and manufacturing sensors for detecting and imaging radiation. RadiantNano is focused on clean energy, medical diagnostics, and national security. In particular, RadiantNano is developing and deploying technology for preventing the proliferation of nuclear materials via smuggling in shipping containers.

== Media appearances ==
Dewan appeared in the documentary Uranium – Twisting the Dragon's Tail, and an episode of Nova entitled "The Nuclear Option" in 2017. In 2019, she hosted National Geographic Partners' web-based series Electric Earth. She is expected to appear in the forthcoming documentary The Limitless Generation. Dewan gave speeches at TEDx University of Rochester in 2019. and Tedx Boca Raton in January, 2022
