= Transatomic Power =

American energy company

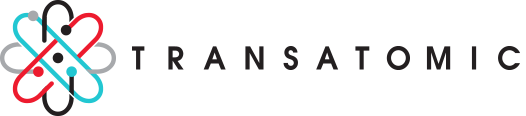
- Company type: Privately held
- Industry: Nuclear power
- Founded: 2011
- Defunct: 2018
- Headquarters: Cambridge, Massachusetts, USA
- Key people: Leslie Dewan (Co-founder); Mark Massie (Co-founder); Russ Wilcox (Board Director)
- Website: transatomicpower.com

Transatomic Power was an American company that designed Generation IV nuclear reactors based on molten salt reactor (MSR) technology.

MIT alumni Dr. Leslie Dewan and Mark Massie founded Transatomic Power in 2011, and its board directors included E Ink Corporation co-founder Russ Wilcox. Among its backers were the venture capital outfit Founders Fund, of which Peter Thiel is a partner. In 2013, the U.S. Department of Energy awarded Transatomic first prize in the ARPA-E Future Energy innovation contest.

In 2018 the company announced that it would be winding down and open source its intellectual property. The company discovered that in 2016 it had made errors in its early analysis and realized that the design couldn't consume nuclear waste. Transatomic Power ceased operation on September 25, 2018.

== Reactor concept ==
Transatomic initial concept was that of a Waste Annihilating Molten Salt Reactor (WAMSR) designed to digest spent nuclear fuel. The concept was based on the Molten-Salt Reactor Experiment reactor that ran at Oak Ridge National Laboratory (ORNL) from 1964 to 1969. It was open to the use of thorium or uranium as a fuel in its reactors. This design was later updated and corrected, and the claim that the reactor is able to use nuclear waste as fuel was dropped.

The latest design is based on a low pressure, high temperature molten salt reactor. Features include:

- A planned capacity of 1250 MWth, converting this to 520 MWe of electricity. This is a conservative rating of 41.6% efficiency.
- Passive nuclear safety features: Fail safe freeze valve and drain tank and Control rods and neutron reflectors - also actively actuatable.
- Lithium fluoride (LiF) fuel salt. This is a departure from the Molten-Salt Reactor Experiment, which used an admixture of beryllium fluoride in its salt to get beryllium's corrosion control and neutron-doubling effects. Transatomic claims that LiF can dissolve more fuel per unit of salt, compensating for LiF's lack of neutron-doubling and higher melting point. An additional issue is that to minimize tritium production, the salt's ratio of lithium 7 should be enhanced. Currently, Lithium 7 is produced only in small amounts, for calibrating mass spectrographs. A single reactor will require quantities on the order of several metric tonnes.
- Moderated by zirconium hydride (ZrH), possibly also using lithium hydride (LiH) and yttrium hydride (YH). ZrH is corroded by molten LiF salt, but an admixture of YH in the moderator may form an anticorrosion barrier of yttrium lithium fluoride.
- The reactor's vat, piping, heat-exchangers and pumps are to be made of "Modified Hastelloy-N," a corrosion-resistant nickel-chromium alloy developed from experience with the Molten-Salt Reactor Experiment. There is no published operating experience using this alloy with LiF in a reactor core, and the salt's lack of a redox control component (such as beryllium) to manage corrosion increases the risk. Regulators may delay commercial deployment of Transatomic's reactor by up to two full refueling cycles to validate this choice. With the Transatomic reactor's long fuel-use cycle, this could take a decade, and pose commercial risks.

== See also ==
- Nuclear fuel cycle
- Nuclear power debate
- Thorium-based nuclear power
