= Bob Widlar =

American electronics engineer (1937–1991)

- Widlar with the artwork of the LM10 in 1977
- Born: Robert John Widlar; November 30, 1937; Cleveland, Ohio, U.S.
- Died: February 27, 1991 (aged 53); Puerto Vallarta, Mexico
- Education: Saint Ignatius High School
- Alma mater: University of Colorado at Boulder
- Occupation: Electronics engineer
- Known for: Integrated circuits pioneer

Robert John Widlar (pronounced wide-lar; November 30, 1937 – February 27, 1991) was an American electronics engineer and a designer of linear integrated circuits (ICs).

== Early years ==
Widlar was born November 30, 1937, in Cleveland to parents of Czech, Irish and German ethnicity. His mother, Mary Vithous, was born in Cleveland to Czech immigrants Frank Vithous (František Vitouš) and Marie Zakova (Marie Žáková). His father, Walter J. Widlar, came from prominent German and Irish American families whose ancestors settled in Cleveland in the middle of the 19th century. A self-taught radio engineer, Walter Widlar worked for the WGAR (1220 AM) radio station and designed pioneering ultra high frequency transmitters. The world of electronics surrounded him since birth: one of his brothers became the first baby monitored by wireless radio. Guided by his father, Bob developed a strong interest in electronics in early childhood.

Widlar never talked about his early years and personal life. He graduated from Saint Ignatius High School in Cleveland and enrolled at the University of Colorado at Boulder. In February 1958 Widlar joined the United States Air Force. He instructed servicemen in electronic equipment and devices and authored his first book, Introduction to Semiconductor Devices (1960), a textbook that demonstrated his ability to simplify complex problems. His liberal mind was a poor match for the military environment, and in 1961 Widlar left the service. He joined the Ball Brothers Research Corporation in Boulder to develop analog and digital equipment for NASA. He simultaneously continued studies at the University of Colorado and graduated with high grades in the summer of 1963.

== Achievements ==
Widlar invented the basic building blocks of linear ICs including the Widlar current source, the Widlar bandgap voltage reference and the Widlar output stage. From 1964 to 1970, Widlar, together with David Talbert, created the first mass-produced operational amplifier ICs (μA702, μA709), some of the earliest integrated voltage regulator ICs (LM100 and LM105), the first operational amplifiers employing single capacitor frequency compensation (LM101), an improved LM101 with FET internal current control (LM101A), and super-beta transistors (LM108). Each of Widlar's circuits had "at least one feature which was far ahead of the crowd" and became a "product champion" in its class. They made his employers, Fairchild Semiconductor and National Semiconductor, the leaders in linear integrated circuits.

He was a "legendary chip designer" at the age of 33. Widlar voluntarily retired into a hideout in Mexico and became "the Valley's most celebrated dropout." Four years later he returned to National Semiconductor as a contractor, and produced a series of advanced linear ICs, including the first ultra-low-voltage operational amplifier with precision 200mV voltage reference (LM10).

Widlar's eccentric, and outspoken personality, as well as his bohemian lifestyle, made him the enfant terrible of Silicon Valley. He is remembered in legends, myths, and anecdotes that are largely true. According to Bo Lojek, author of History of Semiconductor Engineering, he was "more artist than an engineer ... in the environment where Human Relations Departments define what engineers can and cannot comment about, it is very unlikely that we will see his kind again."

== Fairchild Semiconductor (1963–1965) ==
Work at Bell Research brought Widlar in contact with Jean Hoerni and Sheldon Roberts, the creators of radiation hardened transistors and co-founders of Fairchild Semiconductor. Widlar decided to move to a semiconductor manufacturing company, and in 1963 Jerry Sanders, a Fairchild Semiconductor salesman, provided him the opportunity. According to Thomas Lee, Fairchild also wanted to have Widlar on board, and breached professional ethics by recruiting a key employee of their customer. In September 1963 Widlar was invited for an interview with Fairchild research and development (R&D) manager Heinz Ruegg. Widlar arrived at the interview intoxicated, and frankly told Ruegg what he thought about Fairchild's analog circuits: "What they are doing is bullshit". Widlar was sent to another interview with the company's Applications Engineering division, which was based in Mountain View, California. The division head, John Hulme, hired Widlar despite objections from the first round interviewers. Widlar's first assignment at Fairchild targeted IC reliability through adjustments in fabrication processes. This early work, directed by process engineer David Talbert, reduced the cost of the planar process and made possible development of monolithic (fully integrated) linear ICs. Widlar, who formally reported to John Barrett, proved himself capable of quickly improving Barrett's own designs and very soon squeezed his nominal boss out of the company.

In 1963 Fairchild's analog IC lineup, designed to military specifications, consisted of three amplifier circuits. (Note: μA002, μA003, μA004. The μA001 was canceled at an early stage, in no small part due to poor manufacturing yields.) Before Widlar, Fairchild's engineers had designed analog ICs in a style not unlike conventional circuits built with discrete devices. Despite realizing early on that this approach was impractical, owing to the severe limitations of the early planar process, they had not devised working alternatives (active loads and active current sources had yet to be invented). When the original schematic required resistor values that were too low or too high for the planar process, (Note: A square-shaped resistor formed in silicon by diffusion has a resistance of 100 to 200 ohms. Larger values require proportional increases in relative resistor length; lower values require increases in resistor width. Thus, large- or low-value resistors invariably take up more space, with a proportional increase in parasitic capacitance. The practical resistor values available in 1963 were limited to the range of 300 to 1000 ohms; resistors outside of this range exacted a hefty cost penalty - Lojek, pp. 264–265.) designers often had to resort to the use of external nichrome thin film resistors. The resulting hybrid ICs performed poorly and were prohibitively expensive. In response, Fairchild's R&D chief Gordon Moore directed the company to favor digital integrated circuits, which were simpler and also promised high production volumes. Widlar opposed this strategy and held digital electronics in low esteem: "every idiot can count to one". Talbert shared Widlar's belief and became his closest ally in the company.

Widlar was a hard person to work with, but the few men and women who could, like Talbert and Jack Gifford, (Note: "Two people at Fairchild Semiconductor were teamed up with 26-year-old Widlar: David Talbert ... and Jack Gifford, the 24-year-old product manager. He was one of the few people who understood Widlar ...") joined his inner circle for life. Widlar and Talbert closely guarded their trade secrets and kept unwanted co-workers out of the loop. Gifford, one of those accepted by Widlar and Talbert, said that Widlar "would almost talk to nobody and he would only talk to me on, you know, if I could get him in the right mood. And he was still secretive as hell". Talbert pushed Widlar's experimental orders through his plant at top speed, saving his partner four weeks on every batch at the expense of other orders. (Note: "The cycle time at Mountain View line was approximately six weeks, Talbert pushed Widlar's lot in two weeks." See steps of semiconductor fabrication for an overview of the production cycle.) Former Fairchild photographer Richard Steinheimer said in 1995: "Talbert handling the fabrication and Widlar handling the design, they ruled the world and led the world in linear integrated circuits for a couple of decades." Fairchild executive Don Valentine said in 2004: "This was a phenomenal duo of highly eccentric – or whatever the word is beyond eccentric – individuals".

=== μA702 and μA709 ===
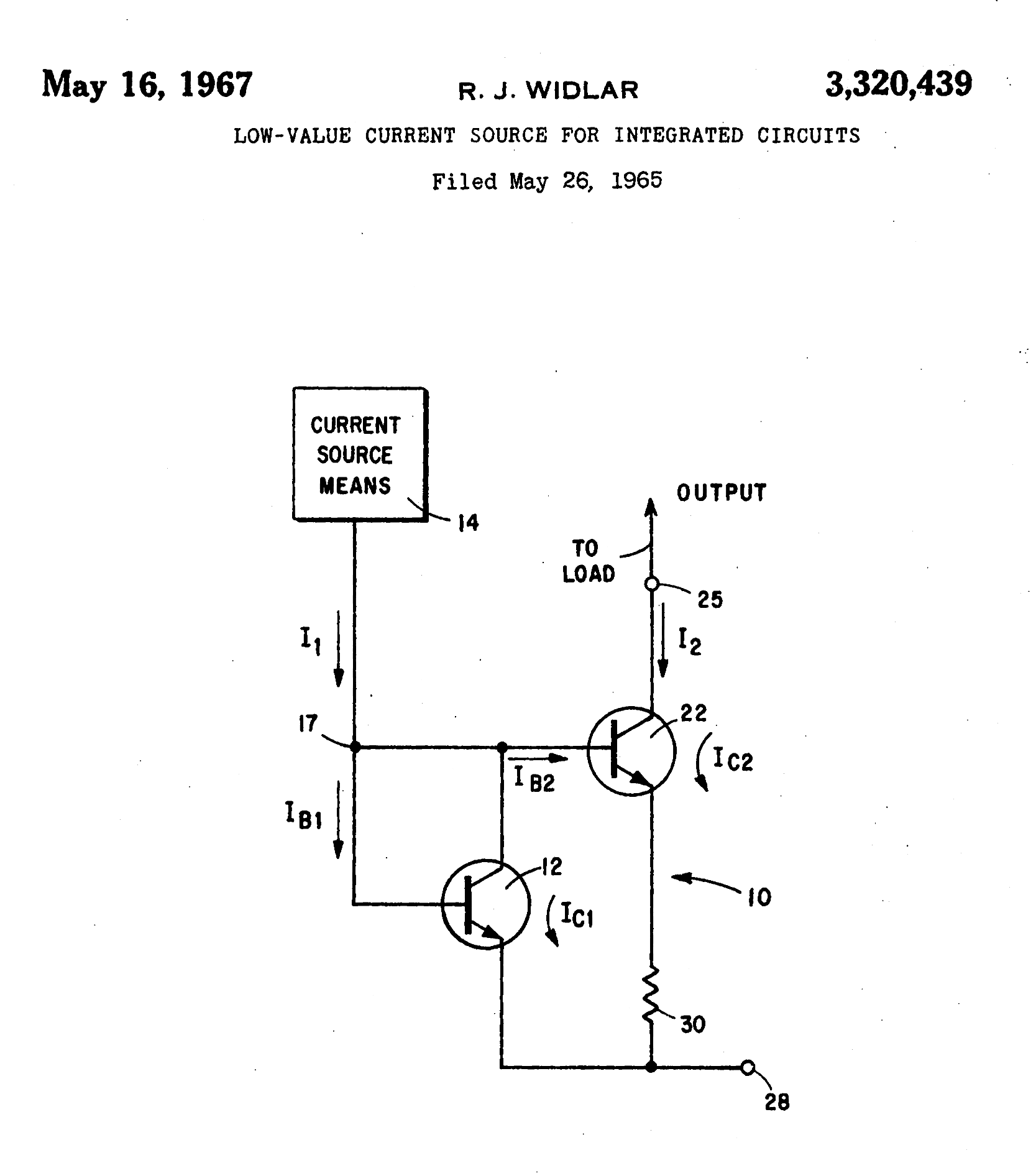
Widlar current source. Original drawing from the 1967 U.S. patent.

Widlar soon grasped the benefits and drawbacks of the planar process: It provided matched components at all temperatures, but these components possessed parasitic capacitance not present in discrete parts, and the process imposed severe constraints on the practical values of resistors and capacitors. He summarised these design rules in a maxim: "Do not attempt to replicate discrete designs in integrated circuit form". Armed with this strategy and Hung-Chang Lin's theory of compensated devices, he designed the industry's first true linear integrated circuit, and the first monolithic operational amplifier, the μA702.

Widlar dispensed with hybrid technology, and used only diffused resistors formed within the silicon die. Each of the nine NPN transistors was sized and shaped according to its function, contrary to an earlier, arbitrary practice of employing standard minimal-area patterns. Widlar introduced three innovations: Interfacing a long-tail with a single-ended stage without losing half of the gain, shifting the DC level using only NPN transistors, and providing optional frequency compensation with an external capacitor. Such compensation increased the bandwidth of the device to 25–30 MHz, an unprecedented breakthrough for monolithic amplifiers at that time. Widlar did not consider the μA702 prototype good enough for production, but Fairchild decided otherwise and rushed the chip into production in October 1964. The device set the direction for the industry for decades, despite limited common-mode range, weak output drive capabilities, and a price of $300 (equivalent to $3,114 in 2025). According to Jack Gifford, the top management of Fairchild noticed the novelty and learned of Widlar's existence only after receiving enthusiastic feedback from the market.

The μA709, which followed the compromised μA702, became a technical and commercial success. Widlar increased the μA709's voltage gain tenfold over that of the μA702 (70,000 vs. 7,000), and improved output performance with a push-pull output stage, although the output lacked protection against short circuits. The input stage was governed by a Widlar current source which allowed generation of low bias currents without the need for area-consumptive high-value resistors. The transistors were equipped with beta-compensation resistors to reduce the effects of inevitable mismatch. Fairchild R&D staff spoke against Widlar's decision to employ lateral PNP transistors. (Note: The early planar process supported the fabrication of NPN transistors only, thus the uA702 and its peers were all-NPN designs. Low-gain lateral transistors, a byproduct of the same process, were dismissed by most designers as uselessly crude.) Widlar locked himself up for 170 hours of continuous experimental work and came out with a robust design that blended two resistive diffusion areas into a usable lateral PNP device.

The μA709 was introduced in November 1965 and became Fairchild's revolutionary flagship product. For a few years, Fairchild was the leader in the field of linear ICs. Demand for its products exceeded its production capacity by a factor of ten; Fairchild's circuits were sold out for two years in advance. (Note: The bulk of Fairchild's μA709 output was purchased by Bendix Corporation. Fairchild produced early op-amps on 1.5-inch diameter wafers, and fabrication capacity was limited to 5,000 devices a week.) Gifford, one of the few men who fully understood Widlar and his work, contributed to the market boom by introducing a dual in-line package. According to Don Valentine, "at one point in time [Widlar and Talbert] were responsible – one designed them and one made them – for more than eighty percent of the linear circuits made and sold in the world". None of Fairchild's competitors came close to matching its status in the market. Fairchild patented Widlar's innovations but never licensed them and never enforced their rights in court. Competitors created clones of μA709 but only Philco succeeded in producing one that fully matched the original.

=== Other designs of note at Fairchild ===
Widlar's tenure at Fairchild was brief but intensely productive. In addition to the groundbreaking designs discussed above, Widlar also put into production the μA710 and μA711 comparators, each exhibiting then-record 40 ns response time. An additional device, the μA726 differential pair, used an on-chip heater with embedded thermostatic control to suppress the effect of ambient temperature on electrical performance.

Widlar's productivity was so great that it has stimulated spurious attributions. A prevalent example erroneously credits him with the design of the μA723 voltage regulator. However, not only was that chip released some two years after Widlar's departure from Fairchild, the circuit employs, and relies on, greatly improved lateral PNP transistors that were not available during the period of Widlar's employment at Fairchild. Credit for the μA723 properly belongs to Darryl Lieux, according to his contemporary (and father of the 741), Dave Fullagar.

== National Semiconductor (1965–1970) ==
Widlar and Talbert realized that the founders of Fairchild did not intend to share their windfall profits with the designers. In November 1965 the two engineers accepted Peter Sprague's offer to join National Semiconductor's Molectro facility in Santa Clara. (Note: Molectro, a formerly independent company established in 1962 as Molecular Science Corporation, had around 30 employees. It produced sensors for the Jet Propulsion Laboratory and pioneered the concept of application-specific integrated circuits. In July 1965 Molectro filed for Chapter 11 bankruptcy and was bought out by National.) Widlar received an immediate stock option of 20,000 shares, each valued at five dollars then. He refused to fill an exit interview form for Fairchild and wrote only one line (exact quote): "I want to be RICH!" He told Hulme that the only thing that could keep him with Fairchild was "One million tax free by whatever way you choose". For unknown reasons, Robert Noyce, one of Fairchild's founders, continued to pay Widlar his salary until April 1966. According to Widlar, "Maybe they did not believe that I was actually leaving. Some people are really a little slow."

Gifford said that Widlar and Talbert were actually the founders of National Semiconductor, and that Sporck joined them later. The duo started by setting up the epitaxial process at Santa Clara. Once the technology was in place, Widlar concentrated on voltage regulators and by the end of 1966 produced the industry's first integrated linear regulator. The LM100, a revolutionary new circuit, became another flagship product that surpassed expectations for sales and longevity. In 1967 Widlar designed the LM101, an operational amplifier with improved gain, decreased input current, and protection against short circuit. The LM101 featured another unorthodox input stage, employing NPN input transistors emitter coupled to PNP transistors in a common base arrangement. The high reverse breakdown voltage of the PNP transistors allowed the LM101 to withstand a differential input voltage of ±30 V. Its frequency compensation was simpler, more robust and more stable than that of μA709. It was followed by LM101A, a functionally identical IC that pioneered the use of a field-effect transistor to control internal current sources. Widlar's solution minimized die area and current drain, and enabled operation over a wide range of power supply voltages. Later he devised another new device, the super-beta transistor. It was created in silicon by Talbert and integrated in the LM108 precision operational amplifier, which was released in 1969. These high-gain, very-low-voltage devices were capable of operating at very low input currents within the full military range of operating conditions. (Note: Input currents of LM108 were on par with contemporary JFET amps, but the latter could not cope with full range of military temperatures.) The items in the linear circuit product line were user friendly, very useful, and very profitable.

In the late 1960s Widlar experimented with the band gap phenomenon and converted his basic current source block into a bandgap voltage reference. "Widlar's Leap" resulted in a robust and stable reference that was crucial for high-current, heat-intensive applications. Its low voltage, typically 1.25V, also allowed more flexibility in discrete and integrated circuit design. Widlar created another industry first by combining a power transistor and a precise voltage reference on the same die. This device, the LM109 voltage regulator, was released in 1969 and at first went unnoticed. In 1971 National Semiconductor released Widlar's LM113, the first dedicated, two-terminal voltage reference IC. (Note: National Semiconductor calls LM113 a reference diode, referring to its two-terminal packaging Reference Diode (Datasheet).)

Widlar and Talbert were instrumental in the takeover of National Semiconductor by former Fairchild Semiconductor managers Charles Sporck, Fred Bialek, Floyd Kvamme, Roger Smullen and Pierre Lamond in February 1967. This new team quickly turned National Semiconductor into a leading producer of electronic circuits, and Fairchild Semiconductor slipped into an irreversible decline. (Note: Soon afterwards Noyce and Moore left Fairchild to start Intel Corporation. This triggered mass desertion of lower-ranking personnel.) Widlar's popularity in the industry soared: advertised as "the man who designed more than half of the world's linear circuits", he frequently gave lectures to fellow engineers, and on May 23, 1970, spoke to an audience at Madison Square Garden. (Note: It was a series of public seminars organized by E. Floyd Kvamme and Don Valentine of National Semiconductors in New York City, Los Angeles and Paris.) Regis McKenna, former National Semiconductor executive, said in 1995 that "most of the linear devices that were probably built and marketed for the period of the sixties and seventies were based on Widlar and Talbert's technology. I mean they created, in many ways, this industry... they were the Steve Jobs and the Bill Gates, and whatever fame you want to give to anybody, they were famous people of those days. And the journals... you couldn't find a journal without their picture in it ...".

== Retirement (1970–1974) ==
On December 21, 1970, Widlar and Talbert resigned from National Semiconductor when National Semiconductor refused to reward them adequately. (Note: Two months earlier, the company was listed on the American Stock Exchange and its share prices rose above $50. Sporck and Lamond exercised their stock options too but stayed with the company.) Widlar cashed in his stock option for $1 million (equivalent to $8,290,488 in 2025), and retired to Puerto Vallarta, Mexico, at the age of 33. For four years he provided consultancy to the industry, but had not been formally employed anywhere for more than three years. His proud statement: "I don't work" caused him frequent troubles when crossing the Mexican border and eventually, Widlar created a set of fake business cards presenting him as a "road agent" for "Morgan Associates".

== National Semiconductor (1974–1981) ==
In November 1974 Widlar returned to National Semiconductor as a consultant.

Richard Hodgson said in 1995:

[Widlar] lived up in the hills behind the campus I think someplace for a while when he was working for National and did the outback designs for them and he'd come back out of his cabin and whatever and go to work for Charlie Sporck for a while and then disappear back again either there or down in Mexico as far I knew...

— Richard Hodgson

=== LM12 and LM10 ===
Some of Widlar's designs like the LM12 power amplifier and the LM10 ultra-low-voltage amplifier introduced in 1978, remain in production in the 21st century. The LM10 is capable of operating with a 1.1V power supply, thus instead of a conventional bandgap reference it employs Widlar's sub-bandgap circuit locked at 200 mV and the low-voltage Widlar output stage. For 10 years, no one else in the industry was able to produce a circuit that matched the LM10.

== Linear Technology (1981–1984) ==
In 1981 Swanson, Dobkin and Widlar co-founded Linear Technology. Swanson steered the company into producing second-source parts for other companies. Three years later the relationships fell apart in a patent right dispute. Widlar claimed rights over Linear's LT1 to LT20 chips, and in May 1984 walked away, leaving the case to his lawyers. In October 1984, Swanson fired Widlar and invoked the mandatory share repurchase provision that was in Widlar's contract. According to Bo Lojek, Widlar's notebooks contained sufficient evidence to prove that many of the disputed patents were created by Widlar before Linear Technology was formed.

Robert Swanson, chairman of Linear Technology, said in 2006:

I remember saying oh God, I don't want to deal with this guy. And I remember Sporck saying 'ah you're a young guy, you can do it. You know, you—you got enough energy to do it.' So basically he worked for the analog group. Sort of he—he worked with Bob Dobkin who was his original protégé. And on a consulting basis, he turned out, you know, some very nice chips for National. But he was a consultant. He wasn't an employee.

— Robert Swanson

== National Semiconductor (1984–1991) ==
Widlar returned to National Semiconductor for the remainder of his life. He and Dobkin never talked to each other after the breakup. Dobkin said in 2006 that "Bob was one of the few people I considered to be a genius. He was also paranoid, very hard to get along with and drank incessantly".

== Death ==
On February 27, 1991, Widlar died of a heart attack at the age of 53, in Puerto Vallarta. David Liddle said in 2009 that "the untimely early death of ... Robert Widlar is a whole story in itself". Early reports incorrectly said that Widlar died while jogging on a beach. Later sources corrected the mistake: he was running up a hill. Bob Pease wrote more precisely: "Apparently he had been jogging on a sidewalk, in a steep hilly section of Puerta Vallarta. Bob was, in recent years, pretty much into fitness, and he worked hard at his running ... I'm no doctor. But he did not die drunk, which may have amazed a number of his colleagues". Jack Gifford concurred: "He didn't die as a derelict. He wasn't, I mean he was fine. He was coherent. Probably leading the most, he was down in Mexico, living in Mexico, but he was sober and leading a reasonable life for him at that point when he died".

== Personality ==
National Semiconductor advertisement (1970s) made according to Widlar's idea.

Widlar lived the life of an alcoholic (Note: George Russell of Commentary magazine called Widlar an "alcoholic genius" while he was still alive.) (Note: Jack Gifford said in 2002 that both Widlar and Talbert "were heavy drinkers".) genius, who went on all-night-long bar binges. According to Jack Gifford, Widlar liked to harass and fight others when drunk, but regularly overestimated his own abilities in such confrontations. On one occasion he was "absolutely clocked" by the offended Mike Scott, a future CEO of Apple Inc.

Charles Sporck retold another incident: during a European roadshow Widlar got drunk and publicly refused to speak to the audience unless he got more gin. Sporck said that "We had no choice. We had to get his glass filled up. And then he went on with the lecture. And he, you know, he got plastered, but the interesting part of it is he was just so damn smart, you know. Even drunk he could just wow these people."

According to fellow analog circuit designer Bob Pease, Widlar cut down on his drinking shortly before death. Gifford said in 2002: "He stopped drinking but I think the damage was probably done, you know, in the first twenty years." According to Bo Lojek, "as he was older he was for the first time able to keep relationship with one woman."

Widlar's eccentric behavior is remembered in legends and anecdotes which, according to Bob Pease, are largely true. He did practice widlarizing – methodically destroying a faulty component or a flawed prototype with a sledgehammer. At the same time, he eradicated all unwanted sounds from his lab by fighting noise with noise. He installed "hassler" devices that emitted high-pitched sounds whenever someone talked too loud, and even blew up an annoying public address speaker with firecrackers. Jim Williams recalled an incident when, after tracing external electromagnetic interference to the control tower of the San Jose airport, Widlar telephoned the airport and demanded they shut down the transmitter.

However, the story about Widlar bringing a goat to trim the lawn in front of his office, retold by The New York Times after his death, was incorrect. It was a sheep, not a goat; Widlar brought her in his Mercedes-Benz convertible for just one day, which included a photo op for the local journalists. According to Pease, Widlar abandoned her in the nearest bar; according to Lojek the sheep was "mysteriously stolen".

== Awards ==
In 2002 Electronic Design inducted Widlar in its Hall of Fame along with Alan Turing and Nikola Tesla. In 2009 Widlar was inducted in the National Inventors Hall of Fame. A sculpture dedicated to Bob Widlar and Jean Hoerni initially stood in front of the Maxim Integrated Products building in Sunnyvale, California; and was relocated in 2012 to Maxim's new headquarters in San Jose, California.

== See also ==
- Bob Dobkin
- Jack Gifford – electronics engineer, entrepreneur, businessman
- Jean Hoerni – silicon transistor pioneer, invented the planar process for making integrated circuits
- Bob Pease – pioneering analog integrated circuit designer, technical author, colleague at National Semiconductor Corporation
- Charles Sporck
- Jim Williams – analog circuit designer, technical author, colleague of Bob Widlar.

== Sources ==
- Doyle, Robert et al. (2007). Fairchild Oral History Panel sessions. Computer History Museum. Sessions 1, 2, 3, 5, 6.
- Fonderie, M. Jeroen; Huijsing, Johan H. (1993). Design of Low-Voltage Bipolar Operational Amplifiers. Boston: Kluwer Academic Publishers. ISBN 0-7923-9317-1.
- Gilder, George F. (1989). Microcosm: The Quantum Revolution in Economics and Technology. New York: Simon & Schuster. ISBN 0-671-50969-1.
- Harrison, Linden T (2005). Current Sources & Voltage References. Amsterdam; New York: Newnes. ISBN 0-7506-7752-X.
- Lécuyer, Christophe (2006). Making Silicon Valley: Innovation and the Growth of High Tech. 1930–1970. Cambridge: MIT Press. ISBN 0-262-12281-2.
- Lee, Thomas H. (2007). Tales of the Continuum: A Subsampled History of Analog Circuits. IEEE Solid-State Circuits Society, October 2007. Retrieved 2010-10-07.
- Lojek, Bo (2006). History of Semiconductor Engineering. New York: Springer. ISBN 3-540-34257-5.
- Pease, Bob (1990). The Design of Band-Gap Reference Circuits: Trials and Tribulations. Originally published in the IEEE Proceedings of the 1990 Bipolar Circuits and Technology Meeting, September 17–18, 1990 in Minneapolis, Minnesota.
- Walker, Rob (director, producer) (1995–2004). The Fairchild Chronicles. Transcript of a video film. Stanford University. 1995–2004.
- Walker, Rob (director, producer) (1995–2008). Stanford and the Silicon Valley Project. Interviews from the SEMI Oral History Project. Stanford University. 1995–2008.
