= Building 20 =

Temporary wooden structure on MIT campus

Coordinates: 42.3619°N 71.0905°W

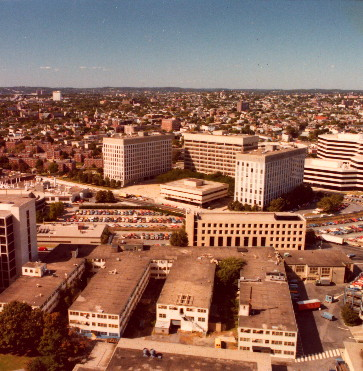
Built in 1943 as a temporary facility, Building 20 (the three-storey building in the foreground of this image) remained in use until 1998, housing a wide variety of research projects.

Building 20 (18 Vassar Street, Cambridge, Massachusetts) was a timber structure erected during World War II on the central campus of the Massachusetts Institute of Technology (MIT). One of three new buildings used for wartime radar research, it was designed in one day to last until the war's end, but remained a productive research facility until its demolition in 1998.

The three-floor, six-wing structure originally housed the classified projects of the Radiation Laboratory, where fundamental advances were made in physical electronics, electromagnetic properties of matter, microwave physics, and microwave communication principles. It has been called one of America's "two prominent shrines of the triumph of science during the war" (along with the desert installation at Los Alamos, where the atomic bomb was born). A former Rad Lab member said, "At one time, more than 20 percent of the physicists in the United States (including nine Nobel Prize winners) had worked in that building".

After the Rad Lab shut down after the end of World War II, Building 20 served as a "magical incubator" for many small MIT programs, research, and student activities for a further fifty-three years.

== Origins ==
The Radiation Laboratory, established in November 1940 to develop microwave radar, initially occupied a two-story lab in MIT's Building 4 and a makeshift "Roof Lab" put on top of Building 6. As the laboratory's staff grew from 35 people in December 1940 to 225 by mid-1941, working space did not keep pace. The approximately 19,800 square feet available across Buildings 3, 4, and 6 provided roughly 100 square feet per person, about half an industrial laboratory would require. The wooden structures on the Building 6 roof drew concern from Cambridge city fire officials. In the summer of 1941 the laboratory seriously considered relocating to a site near Mitchell Field, Long Island, before deciding to remain at MIT.

Instead, ground was broken in August 1941 for Building 24, a permanent fireproof structure behind the main campus buildings. After Pearl Harbor, lab director Lee DuBridge estimated that the laboratory would need to grow to six times its current size, requiring upwards of 3,000 people. NDRC approved adding four floors and a penthouse to Building 24, and a temporary three-story wooden structure, Building 22, went up next door, connected by an overpass. Personnel rose from 450 at the start of 1942 to 1,700 by year's end.

Building 20, completed in December 1943, was part of this continued expansion. It was originally referred to by one of the architects, George McCreery of McCreery & Theriault, as the "Building 22 Annex". According to Robert Buderi, the building was designed in less than an afternoon and erected in roughly six months. Wartime steel shortages forced the use of heavy wood timbers, and the Cambridge building authorities had to exempt the structure from city building codes. McCreery noted that Building 20 was designed and constructed "as a war measure, the life of said building to be for the duration of the war and six months thereafter."

In 1945, as the Rad Lab prepared to close down, these temporary buildings were not taken down immediately, since post-war student enrollments were increasing dramatically and more space was still needed. Building 22 was remade into a temporary dormitory, which housed 600 students by 1947. Building 20 continued to be used for machine shops, research labs, and offices. Building 22 was later demolished to make room for Building 26 (the Karl Taylor Compton Laboratories). As of 2026, Building 24 still stands as the sole surviving structure from the wartime period, still being used for labs, offices, and classrooms.

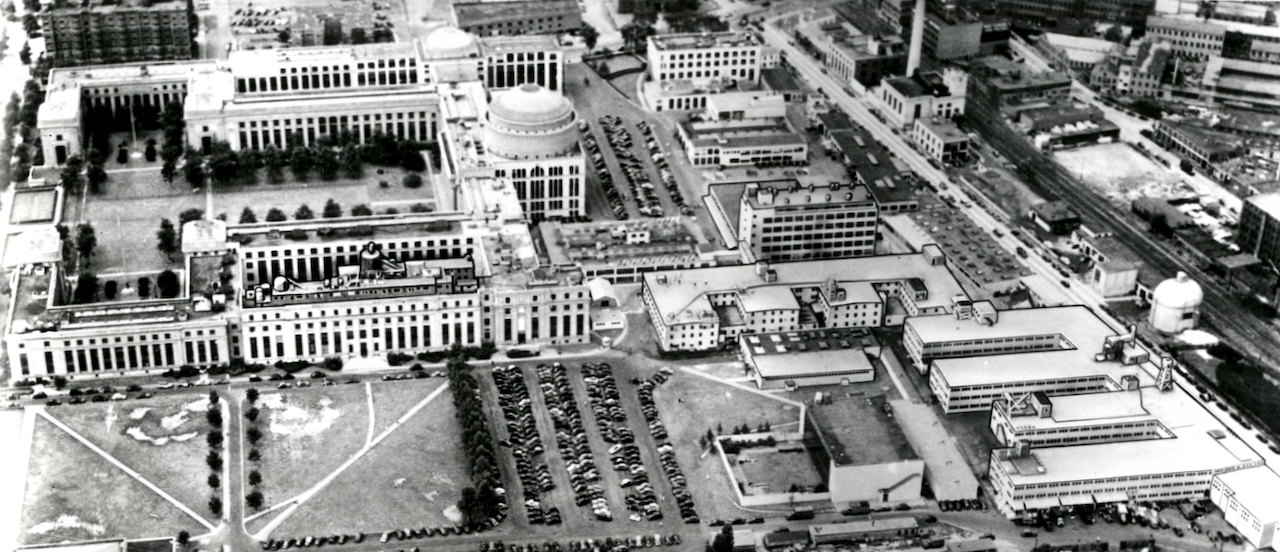
Buildings constructed on MIT campus for the Rad Lab, 1940–1943

1 / Building 4 annex (11/1940); 2 / Roof Lab, Building 6 (12/1940)	3 / Building 24 (11/1941–7/1942); 4 / Building 22 (5/1942)	5 / Building 20 (12/1943)

== Structure ==
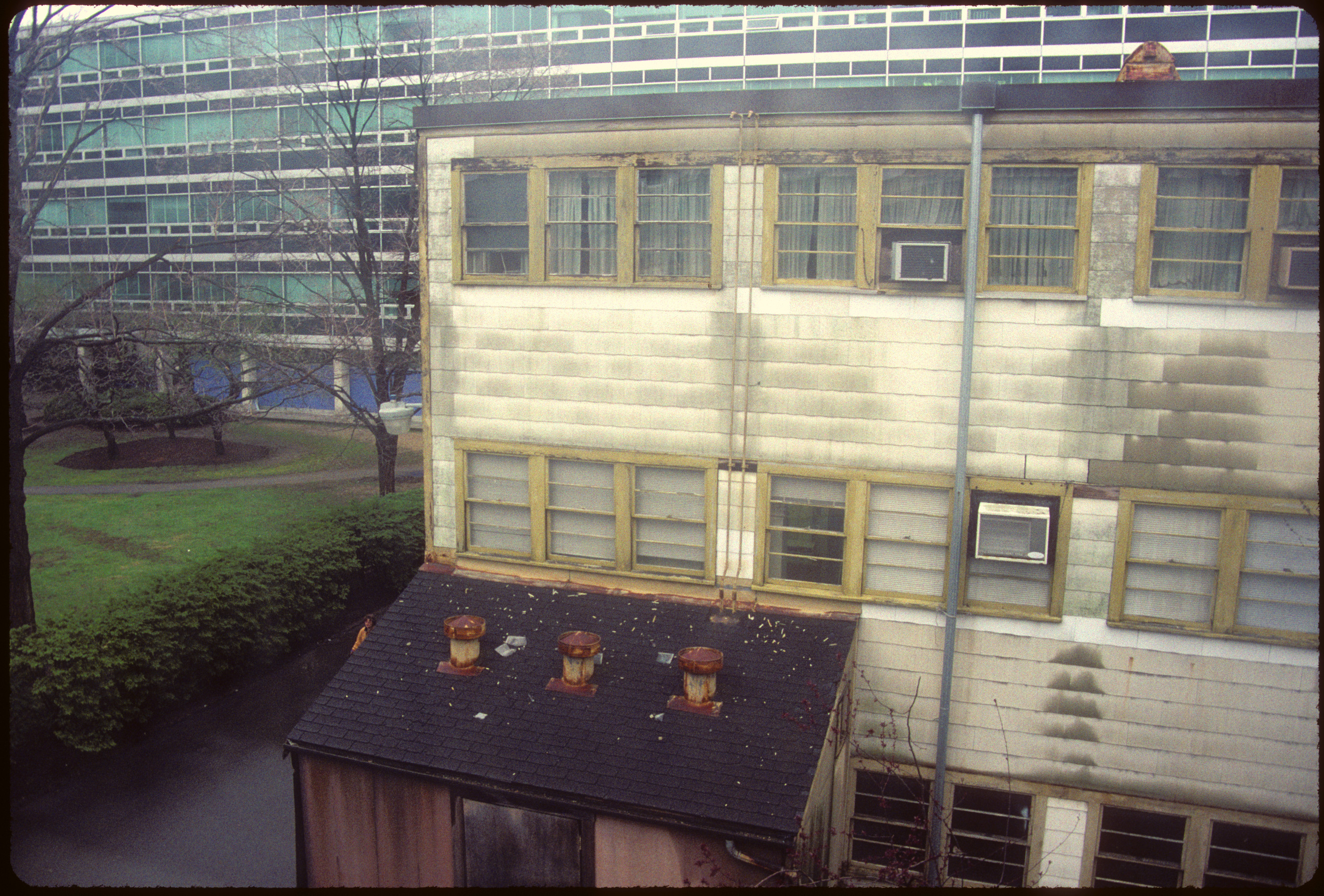
Exterior of MIT Building 20 wing A, viewed from wing E, with Building 26 in background

The building continued to be used until shortly before its demolition in 1998, making it one of the longest-surviving World War II temporary structures on campus. The building had the overall shape of an extended mirror-reversed "F", with multiple parallel "wings" connected to a longer spine which paralleled Vassar Street. The spine of the "F" (wing B) was slightly skewed compared to the projecting wings, because of the gradual divergence of Vassar Street compared to Memorial Drive, which runs parallel to the Charles River Basin.

The three-floor structure was framed with large wooden posts and beams, supporting massive floor planks which creaked and groaned underfoot. The structure was extremely sturdy, but it complained continually under its burden of heavy equipment and material. The ground level floor was concrete slab. Over time, the interior walls became a hodgepodge of Transite, Masonite, and gypsum wallboard as various occupants grew, shrank, or repurposed their spaces.

The roof was flat, covered in tar paper and gravel, and emitted radiant heat into the top floor whenever the sun shone. The outer sheathing consisted of asbestos-cement shingles painted a dirty white in a vain attempt to reduce solar heat load. The windows were leaky, rattling wooden sash, and bristled with numerous large window-mounted air conditioners, since the interior spaces would otherwise become unbearably hot during warm weather.

Wings A, B, and C were built first, in a Π shape. The later wings were assigned the letters D, E, and F. Although there was no basement, the ground floor was assigned room numbers beginning with "0", underscoring complaints of some occupants that the first floor corridors looked like a basement. The idiosyncratic floor numbering required the second floor to use "1", and the third floor to use "2", a confusing exception to the usual logical MIT scheme for assigning room numbers (although the same as floor numbering in Britain). Thus, a typical room number might be "20B-119", located in Wing B, on the second floor.

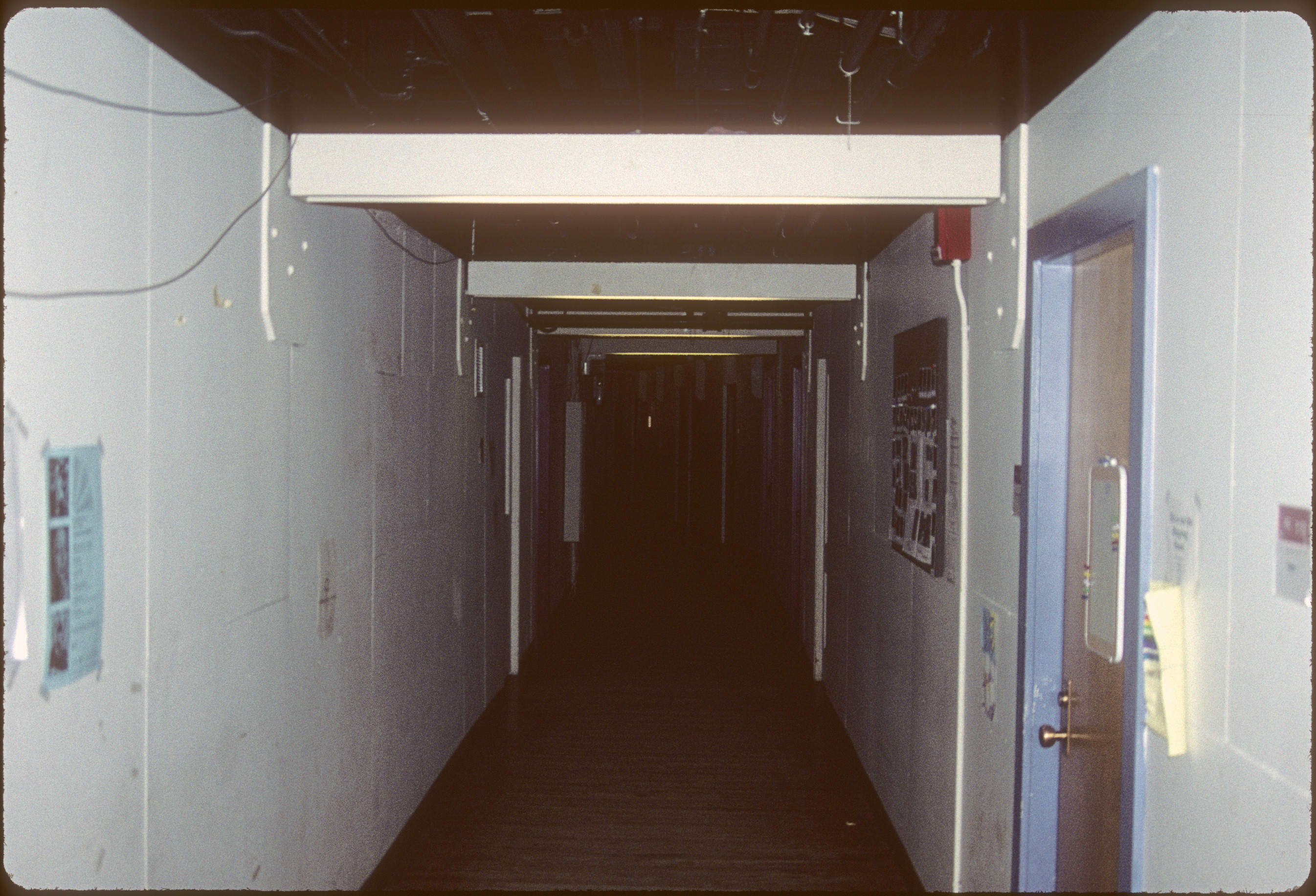
Windowless hallway inside MIT Building 20, wing A

There was little provision to admit daylight to the narrow interior corridors, which were dimly lit even as summer heat baked them. Heat and humidity released a distinctive "old familiar musty odor" recalled by an occupant years later. Opening a windowless corridor door would disclose a blaze of light, or a dark gloomy space, depending on the occupancy of the room. In warm weather, the constant drone of large fans and air conditioners dominated all other sounds.

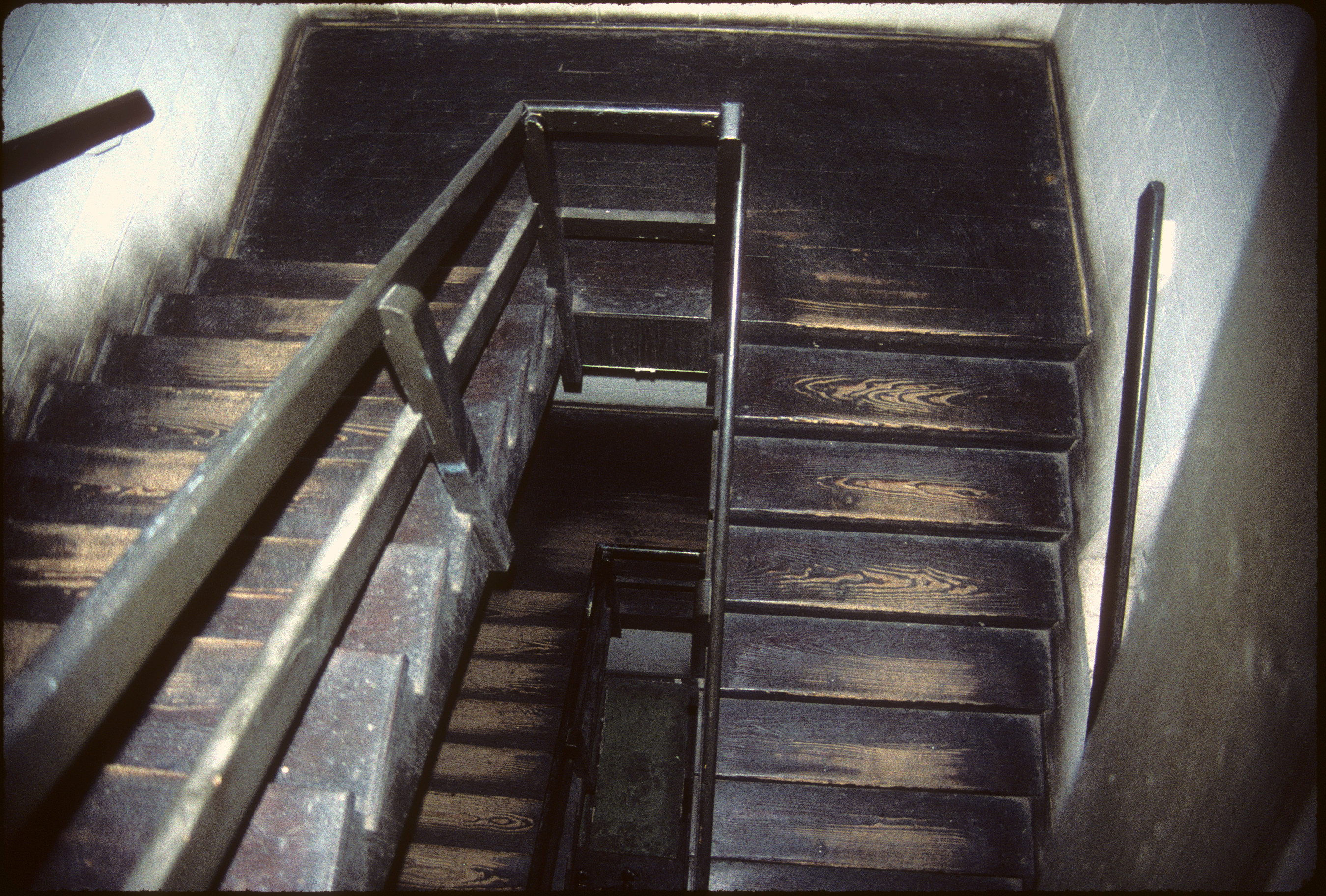
Looking down the stairs from the top floor revealed rugged wooden construction (MIT Building 20, wing A)

The outdoors spaces between the wings accommodated an assortment of rusty equipment and storage tanks, picnic tables, unidentified junk, and drill spaces used by ROTC students. At various times, chain link fence was installed or removed, especially during times of student unrest in the late 1960s and early 1970s.

== Occupants ==
Due to Building 20's origins as a temporary structure, researchers and other occupants felt free to modify their environment at will. As described by MIT professor Paul Penfield, "Its 'temporary nature' permitted its occupants to abuse it in ways that would not be tolerated in a permanent building. If you wanted to run a wire from one lab to another, you didn't ask anybody's permission — you just got out a screwdriver and poked a hole through the wall." Many building occupants were unaware of the presence of asbestos.

Institute Professor Emeritus Morris Halle commented that the abundance of space in Building 20 meant that "many quite risky projects got off the ground. Linguistics, my field, was one such risky project. But for the existence of Building 20, it would not have been developed at MIT." Noam Chomsky pioneered modern linguistics and generative grammar in a "shabby" nondescript-looking "miserable hole" of an office in Building 20 for several decades.

MIT professor Jerome Y. Lettvin once quipped, "You might regard it as the womb of the Institute. It is kind of messy, but by God it is procreative!"

Because of its various inconveniences, Building 20 was never considered to be prime space, in spite of its location in the central campus. As a result, Building 20 served as an "incubator" for all sorts of start-up or experimental research, teaching, or student groups on a crowded campus where space was (and remains) at a premium. The experimental Concourse teaching group, the Integrated Studies Program (ISP), and the High School Studies Program (HSSP) all found initial homes here.

Some of the early work of the Educational Research Center (ERC) and the Physical Science Study Committee (PSSC), which reformed teaching of high school physics in the post-Sputnik years, was started here. The closing of the ERC was followed by the establishment of the Division for Study and Research in Education (DSRE). Coordinated by Benson R. Snyder, Donald A. Schon, and Seymour Papert, the DSRE was an innovative interdisciplinary center for "learning about learning" at the individual, institutional and societal levels, and made significant contributions to the development of the field of cognitive science.

Building 20 was the home of the Tech Model Railroad Club, where many aspects of what later became the hacker culture developed. Around 1973, the MIT Electronic Research Society (MITERS) was founded there, as an early student-run hackerspace. Building 20 also housed one of the first anechoic chambers, where research was performed by acoustics pioneer Leo Beranek. Professor Amar Bose did his early research on loudspeakers here, eventually leading to the founding of Bose Corporation. Prolific analog circuit designer and technical writer Jim Williams had an electronics lab here for a decade, before moving on to National Semiconductor and then Linear Technology. The Strobe Lab of high-speed photography trailblazer Harold "Doc" Edgerton was located here for many years, although the facility was relocated to Building 4 before the final years of Building 20.

Plaque on the main entry door to Weiss' Lab in Wing F

Professor Rainer Weiss' group was housed in Building 20 from the 1970s until the building was torn down. Balloon-lifted packages to measure the cosmic microwave background, and the Cosmic Background Explorer (COBE) satellite's FIRAS instrument and its analysis all had homes there. The LIGO gravitational-wave antenna project was also germinated in Building 20, with prototypes of various detectors built, as well as the writing of the Blue Book which was the first thorough study to build a gravitational-wave antenna. Many of the leaders of the gravitational-wave field did their early work in the F Wing of the building.

In the last half of the 1980s, Building 20 became home to the Biological Process Engineering Center, a National Science Foundation Engineering Research Center run by Institute Professor Daniel I.C. Wang. Building 20 also was the home of the MIT Linguistics section, which became the Department of Linguistics and Philosophy in 1976, and the Anthropology section of the Humanities Department.

The MIT Undergraduate Research Opportunities Program (UROP), the MIT Council for the Arts, and the predecessor to the Environmental Health and Safety (EHS) Office were among the assorted administrative offices that sheltered in Building 20. Here also was the home of Reserve Officers' Training Corps (ROTC) offices and facilities. After Harvard University shut down its own ROTC program in 1969, its students who wished to join such a program shared facilities with MIT's ongoing ROTC program in Building 20. Students from Boston University (BU) also came to Building 20 for ROTC training.

Dean of the MIT School of Architecture and Planning William J. Mitchell later acknowledged the influence of Building 20 on the design of the new Stata Center which was to replace it, saying "People didn't love this building for its beauty or its comfort, but for its flexibility. What we learned from Building 20's success was that we would need to provide modern services and technology without being rigid or constraining."

== Demolition ==
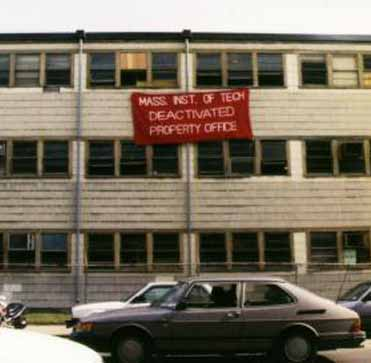
In 1998, shortly before the building's demolition, students added a giant "deactivated" sign, an oversized copy of the sticker attached to decommissioned MIT equipment.

Building 20 was gradually emptied in 1996–1998, and demolished to make way for the Ray and Maria Stata Center (Building 32). Demolition may have been slowed by the need to relocate the many small research, administrative, and student groups located there, plus the special precautions needed to safely dispose of asbestos, lead paint, and PCBs found throughout the World War II vintage structure. Some of its previous occupants moved into the new Stata Center upon its completion, while other "Building 20 refugees" moved to Building N51/N52 or permanently dispersed to other locations on campus.

On March 27, 1998, "The Magic Incubator", an all-day farewell celebration, was held in honor of Building 20, its former occupants, and the feats accomplished therein. Professor Jerry Lettvin published an "Elegy for Building 20" to mark the occasion.

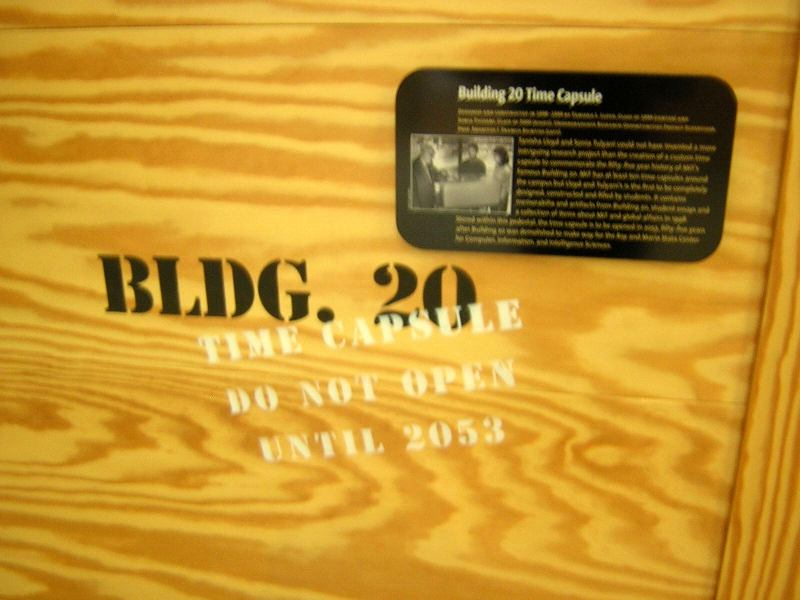
Building 20 time capsule, to be opened in 2053. Until then, it is on display in the Stata Center, which replaced the older structure.

In addition, a time capsule box was prepared, which is now displayed in the new Stata Center which was erected on the site. The time capsule along with several large informational panels about the history of Building 20 are located on the first floor of the Stata Center, near the Dreyfoos Tower elevators, and may be viewed by visitors during normal office hours.

In its final years, Building 20 and its demise were marked by some farewell hacks (student pranks). In March 1998, a large red banner appeared bearing the words "MASS. INST. OF TECH. — DEACTIVATED — PROPERTY OFFICE", mimicking the stickers the MIT Property Office affixes to obsolete equipment removed from inventory tracking in preparation for surplus disposal. In April 1999, a full-sized elevator shaft enclosure was "found" amidst the rubble of the just-demolished Building 20, with a floor indicator panel including levels "G" and "B1" through "B5", implying that the elevator traveled to previously-concealed secret lab space below the ground floor of Building 20. In the years since, there has been a persistent joke on campus that the old Building 20 is still standing, but concealed by an invisibility cloaking field.

== See also ==
- Campus of the Massachusetts Institute of Technology
- Jim Williams
