= Pierre Lamond =

French venture capitalist (born 1930)

- Born: September 12, 1930 (age 96); France
- Education: Electrical Engineering; Master's degree in Physics; Master's degree in Electrical Engineering
- Alma mater: University of Toulouse; Northeastern University
- Occupation: venture capitalist

Pierre R Lamond (born September 12, 1930) is a venture capitalist in Silicon Valley who has specialized in semiconductors, systems and cleantech. He was a partner at Sequoia Capital based in Menlo Park, California, from 1981 until he left to join Vinod Khosla's Khosla Ventures as General Partner in March 2009. He left Khosla Ventures in 2014 and joined Eclipse Ventures as a Partner in 2015.

== Career ==
"Typically our style of investment is to invest early. First, we try to identify potentially profitable sectors of the market before everyone else does. At that point, we can get involved in the seed and first financing rounds, become active at the board level and participate in establishing strategy and start recruiting a management team."

— Lamond in 1999.

Lamond was born in France and studied Electrical Engineering at the University of Toulouse as an undergraduate, where he also received a master's degree in Physics. He then gained another master's degree in Electrical Engineering from Northeastern University.

His first job was an engineer with Transitron Electronics in 1957. In January 1962, he joined Gordon Moore's Fairchild Semiconductor, before he left in 1967 to run the company's spin-off, National Semiconductor, with Charles E. Sporck and Bob Widlar. At National Semiconductor they made the-then bold move of assembling all their semiconductor components outside the US, in Hong Kong and Singapore.

He has also been an executive at Coherent Radiation, where he was CEO until January 1976, and Advent Corp., a home-entertainment equipment company, where he was CEO from March 1976 until May 1977.

During his tenure at Sequoia Capital, Lamond was chairman at Cypress Semiconductor, Microchip Semiconductor, Vitesse Semiconductor, Redback Networks, Plumtree Software, Verisity and a Director of a number of other companies. While at Sequoia he acted as a mentor for the founders of YouTube. Despite being an early investor in several social network startups, he said in 2007 that "We're in Web 2.0 bubble in my opinion." In 2009, Sequoia acrimoniously split with Lamond after he had made personal investments from his family office and referred deals to his son.

He is a past president of the Western Association of Venture Capitalists. He had intended to retire in 2009, but instead joined Khosla, who specialise in energy-related companies, after being impressed with their focus on investing in research-based ventures. At Khosla Ventures, Lamond was on the Board of Seeo, Soladigm, Cogenra, Seamicro (sold to AMD), Point Source Power, Skybox. In 2015, Lamond joined Lior Susan, who was to lead Formation 8's hardware fund before the firm's split. Instead they founded Eclipse Ventures where he is currently Partner Emeritus. At Eclipse, Lamond is on the Boards of Light Lab, Kindred, Diassess, Cerebras, Flex Logix, Visible, and Oxide Computer Company. In 2026, he donated $30 million to Duke University's electrical and computer engineering department.

== Personal life ==
Lamond is married. His son David is President of Lamond Capital Partners. Lamond has two other children, Patricia and Philip.
