= Jim Williams (analog designer) =

American engineer (1948–2011)

- Born: April 14, 1948
- Died: June 12, 2011 (aged 63); California
- Occupation: Electronics engineer

James M. Williams (April 14, 1948 – June 12, 2011) was an analog circuit designer and technical author who worked for the Massachusetts Institute of Technology (1968–1979), Philbrick, National Semiconductor (1979–1982) and Linear Technology Corporation (LTC) (1982–2011). He wrote over 350 publications relating to analog circuit design, including five books, 21 application notes for National Semiconductor, 62 application notes for Linear Technology, and over 125 articles for EDN Magazine.

Williams suffered a stroke on June 10 and died on June 12, 2011.

== Bibliography (partial) ==
- Williams, Jim (Aug 1984), Understanding and applying the LT1005 multifunction regulator, Application Note, vol. 1, Linear Technology Corp
- Williams, Jim (Sep 1987), Switching regulators for poets: A gentle guide for the trepidatious (PDF), Application Note, vol. 25, Linear Technology Corp
- Williams, Jim (Feb 1988), Thermocouple measurement (PDF), Application Note, vol. 28, Linear Technology Corp
- Williams, Jim (June 1990), Bridge circuits: Marrying gain and balance (PDF), Application Note, vol. 43, Linear Technology Corp
- Williams, Jim, ed. (1991), Analog Circuit Design: Art, Science and Personalities, The EDN Series for Design Engineers, Butterworth-Heinemann, ISBN 978-0-7506-9640-1
- Williams, Jim (Aug 1991), High speed amplifier techniques (PDF), Application Note, vol. 47, Linear Technology Corp
- Williams, Jim, ed. (1995), The Art and Science of Analog Circuit Design, The EDN Series for Design Engineers, Butterworth–Heinemann, ISBN 0-7506-9505-6, "MIT building 20 at 3:00 A.M./ Tek. 547, pizza, breadboard./ That's Education."
- Williams, Jim (Nov 1995), A fourth generation of LCD backlight technology (PDF), Application Note, vol. 65, Linear Technology Corp
- Williams, Jim (Sep 1999), 30 nanosecond settling time measurement for a precision wideband amplifier (PDF), Application Note, vol. 79, Linear Technology Corp
- Williams, Jim (May 2003), Slew rate verification for wideband amplifiers: The taming of the slew (PDF), Application Note, vol. 94, Linear Technology Corp
- Williams, Jim (Mar 2010), 1ppm settling time measurement for a monolithic 18-bit DAC: When does the last angel stop dancing on a speeding pinhead? (PDF), Application Note, vol. 120, Linear Technology Corp
- Williams, Jim (Apr 2011), An introduction to acoustic thermometry (PDF), Application Note, vol. 131, Linear Technology Corp

For a complete bibliography, see.

== See also ==
- Paul Brokaw
- Barrie Gilbert
- Howard Johnson (electrical engineer)
- Bob Pease — analog electronics engineer, technical author, and colleague. Pease died in an automobile accident after leaving Williams' memorial.
- Bob Widlar — pioneering analog integrated circuit designer, technical author, early consultant to Linear Technology Corporation
- Building 20 — legendary MIT building where Jim Williams had a design lab early in his career
