= Bob Pease =

American electronics engineer (1940–2011)

- Born: Robert Allen Pease; August 22, 1940; Rockville, Connecticut
- Died: June 18, 2011 (aged 70); Saratoga, California
- Education: Massachusetts Institute of Technology (BSEE 1961)
- Occupations: Electronics engineer Technical author
- Known for: Analog integrated circuit design
- Spouse: Nancy Pease
- Children: Two sons

Robert Allen Pease (August 22, 1940 – June 18, 2011) was an electronics engineer known for analog integrated circuit (IC) design, and as the author of technical books and articles about electronic design. He designed several very successful "best-seller" ICs, many of them in continuous production for multiple decades. These include LM331 voltage-to-frequency converter, and the LM337 adjustable negative voltage regulator (complement to LM317).

== Life and career ==
Pease was born on August 22, 1940, in Rockville, Connecticut. He attended Northfield Mount Hermon School in Massachusetts, and subsequently obtained a Bachelor of Science in Electrical Engineering (BSEE) degree from Massachusetts Institute of Technology in 1961. He started work in the early 1960s at George A. Philbrick Researches (GAP-R). GAP-R pioneered the first reasonable-cost, mass-produced operational amplifier (op-amp), the K2-W. At GAP-R, Pease developed many high-performance op-amps, built with discrete solid-state components.

In 1976, Pease moved to National Semiconductor Corporation (NSC) as a Design and Applications Engineer, where he began designing analog monolithic ICs, as well as design reference circuits using these devices. He had advanced to Staff Engineer by the time of his departure in 2009. During his tenure at NSC, he began writing a popular continuing monthly column called "Pease Porridge" in Electronic Design about his experiences in the world of electronic design and application.

The last project Pease worked on was the THOR-LVX (photo-nuclear) microtron Advanced Explosives contraband Detection System: "A Dual-Purpose Ion-Accelerator for Nuclear-Reaction-Based Explosives-and SNM-Detection in Massive Cargo".

Pease was the author of eight books, including Troubleshooting Analog Circuits, and he held 21 patents. Although his name was listed as "Robert A. Pease" in formal documents, he preferred to be called "Bob Pease" or to use his initials "RAP" in his magazine columns.

His other interests included hiking and biking in remote places, and working on his old Volkswagen Beetle, which he often mentioned in his columns. Pease's writing was "strongly opinionated, but he could communicate with a wry sense of humor that endeared him to readers whether they agreed with him or not".

My favorite programming language is ... solder.

== Death ==
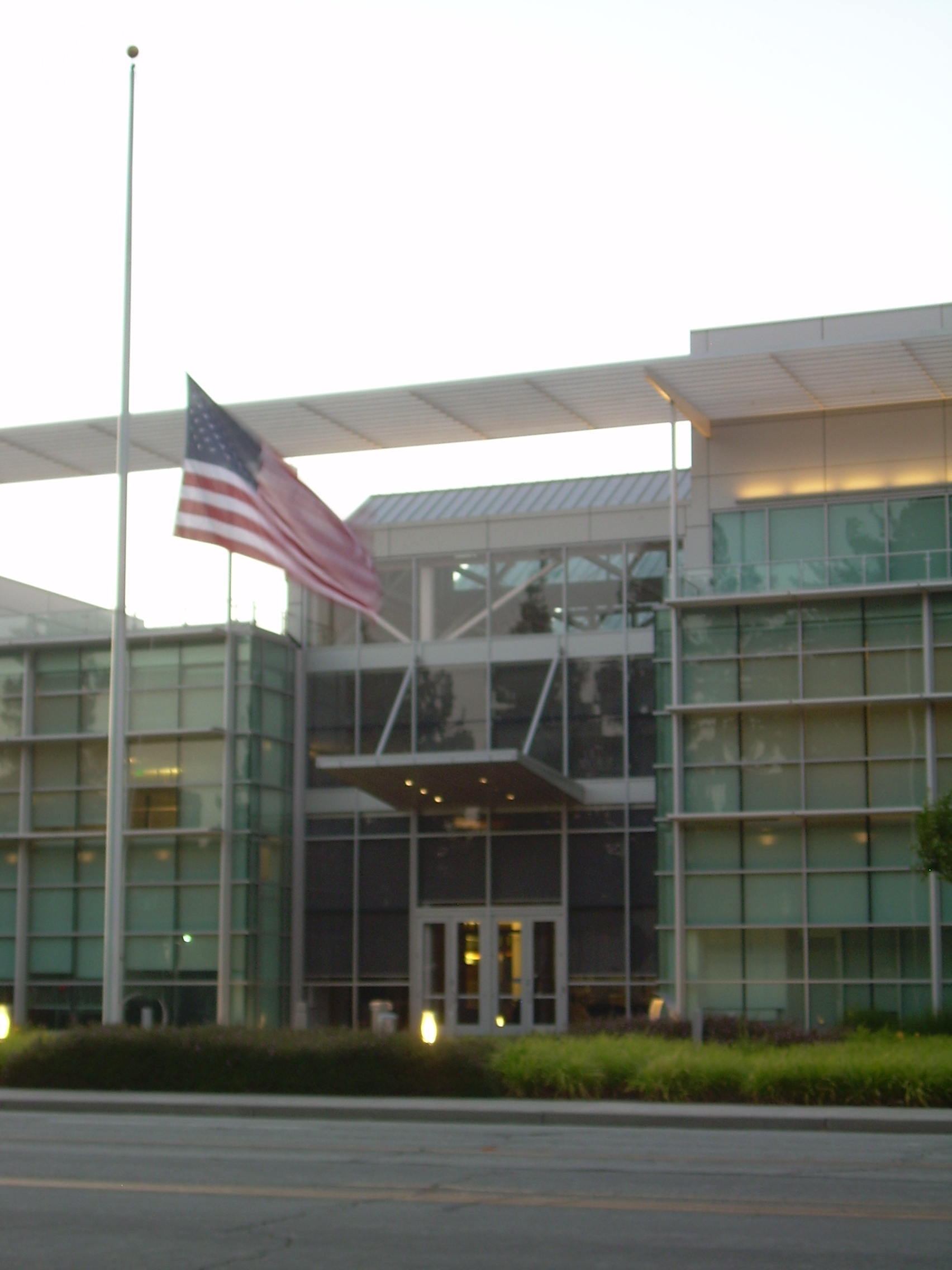
Flag at half-staff at National Semiconductor on June 21, 2011

Pease was killed in the crash of his 1969 Volkswagen Beetle, on June 18, 2011. He was leaving a gathering in memory of Jim Williams, who was another well-known analog circuit designer, a technical author, and a renowned staff engineer working at Linear Technology. Pease was 70 years old, and was survived by his wife, two sons, and three grandchildren. The sudden death of Pease triggered a small flood of remembrances and tributes from fellow technical writers, practicing engineers, and electronics hardware hacking enthusiasts.

Bob was notorious for his design chops, but also for his messy office. Below is one of his early offices at National, where he won a contest from a newspaper for messiest desk. Nancy (his wife) recollects, “It was a San Jose Mercury News messiest desk contest. Someone entered a picture of his office on his behalf, and asked him if he won a big prize would he share it. Bob didn’t know what the prize was at the time. The competition was in no way up to his entry, so they gave him 1st, 2nd, and 3rd prizes. The prize was for office furniture. Bob sold it to National and threw a pizza party with the money.”

== Publications (partial) ==
Books

- Pease, Robert A. (1993). Troubleshooting analog circuits. Boston: Butterworth-Heinemann. ISBN 978-0-7506-9499-5. – An industry standard bench-top reference book for troubleshooting (and designing) analog circuits
- Pease, Bob (1998). How to Drive Into Accidents ... and How Not To [An idiosyncratic, entertaining, and insightful book on safe driving techniques, written for novices and experienced drivers alike]. San Francisco: self-published. ISBN 978-0-9655648-1-6. Archived from the original on June 8, 2001. "What was the first motivation for the book? My cousin Ellen Hubbard lost her 16-year-old daughter Christine to an unfortunate driving accident, a few years back. The official police report said that they did not know how the accident happened. But two young women died when their car was hit by a truck. The idea of a book began to grow, but I got sidetracked until the fall of 1994."
- Pease, Robert A., ed. (2008). Analog Circuits: World Class Designs. The Newnes World Class Designs Series. Newnes. ISBN 978-0-7506-8627-3.
- Ashby, Darren; Baker, Bonnie; Ball, Stuart; Crowe, J.; Hayes-Gill, Barrie; Hickman, Ian; Kester, Walt; Mancini, Ron; Grout, Ian; Pease, Robert; Tooley, Mike; Williams, Tim; Wilson, Peter; Zeidman, Bob (2008). Circuit Design: Know It All. The Newnes Know It All Series. Newnes. ISBN 978-1-85617-527-2.

Journals

- Pease, Robert A. (December 1984). "A new Fahrenheit temperature sensor". IEEE Journal of Solid-State Circuits. 19 (6): 971–977. Bibcode:1984IJSSC..19..971P. doi:10.1109/JSSC.1984.1052253. S2CID 43707191.
- What’s All This Widlar Stuff, Anyhow? – An article about the then-recently deceased op-amp designer Bob Widlar, written by Bob Pease in Electronic Design; re-published on Jun 29, 2012; first published on July 25, 1991

== See also ==
- Jim Williams – analog circuit designer, technical author, colleague of Bob Pease
- Bob Widlar – pioneering analog integrated circuit designer, technical author, colleague at National Semiconductor Corporation, early contractor to Linear Technology Corporation
