= Stata Center =

Academic building in Cambridge, Massachusetts, US

Coordinates: 42.361640°N 71.090255°W

Ray and Maria Stata Center
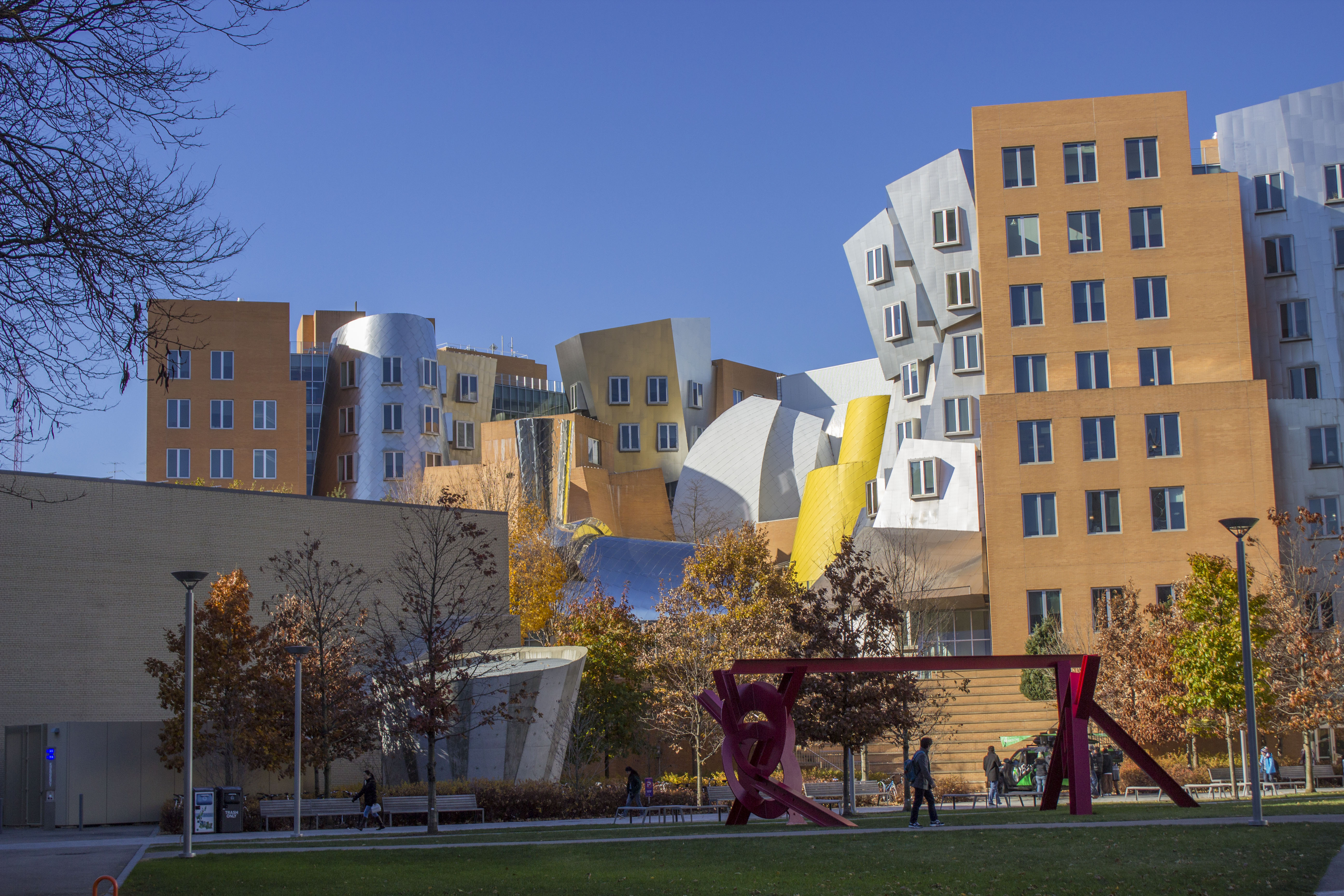
- Stata Center in November 2013
- Alternative names: Building 32

General information
- Architectural style: Deconstructivist
- Location: 32 Vassar Street, Cambridge, Massachusetts, United States
- Opened: March 16, 2004
- Owner: Massachusetts Institute of Technology

Design and construction
- Architect: Frank Gehry

The Stata Center, officially the Ray and Maria Stata Center and sometimes referred to as Building 32, is a 430,000-square-foot (40,000 m^{2}) academic complex plus 290,000-square foot (27,000 m^{2}) underground garage designed by architect Frank Gehry for the Massachusetts Institute of Technology (MIT). The building opened for initial occupancy on March 16, 2004. It is located on the site of MIT's former Building 20, which had housed the historic MIT Radiation Laboratory, at 32 Vassar Street in Cambridge, Massachusetts.

== Description ==
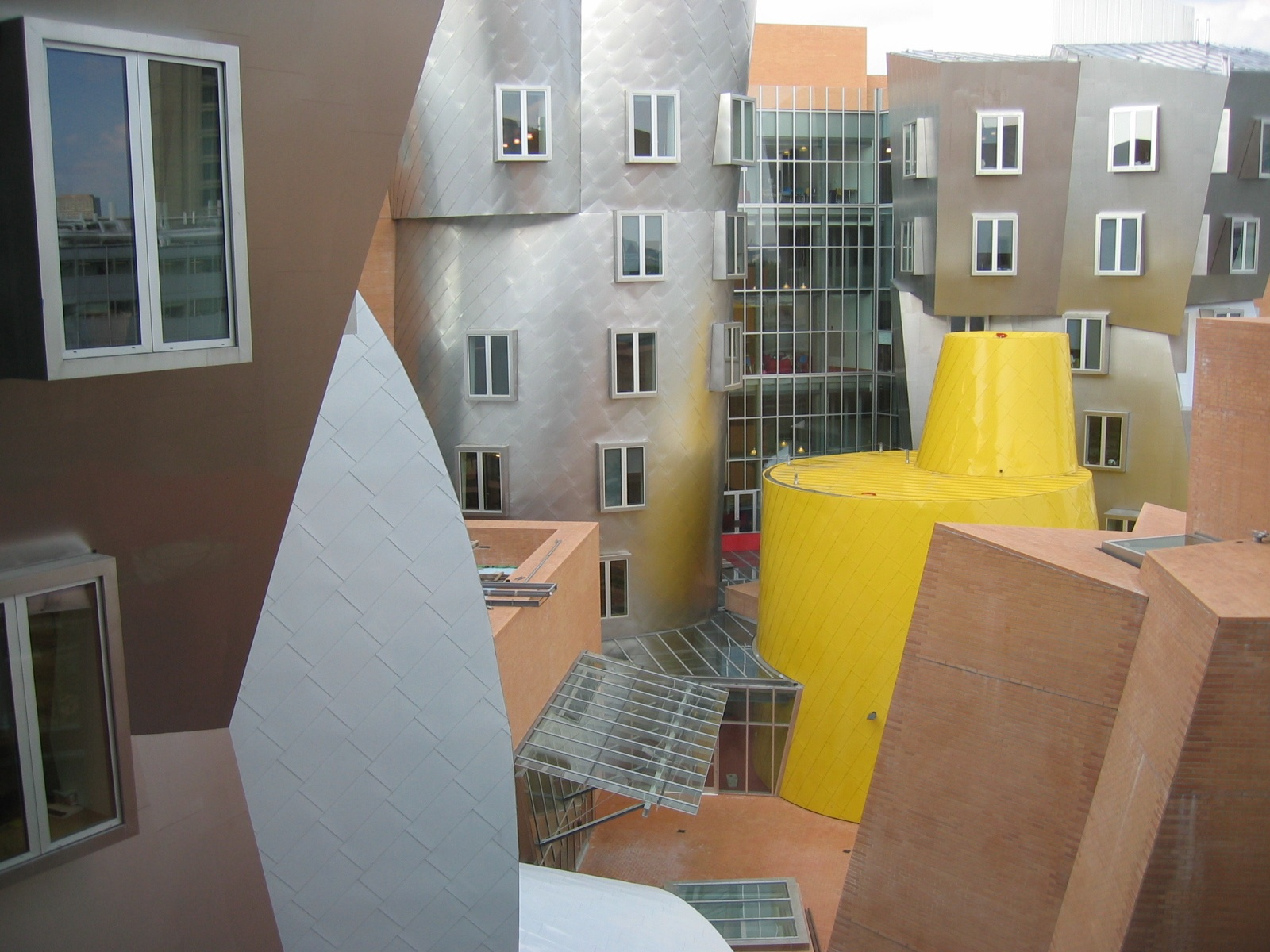
View from an upper-floor window

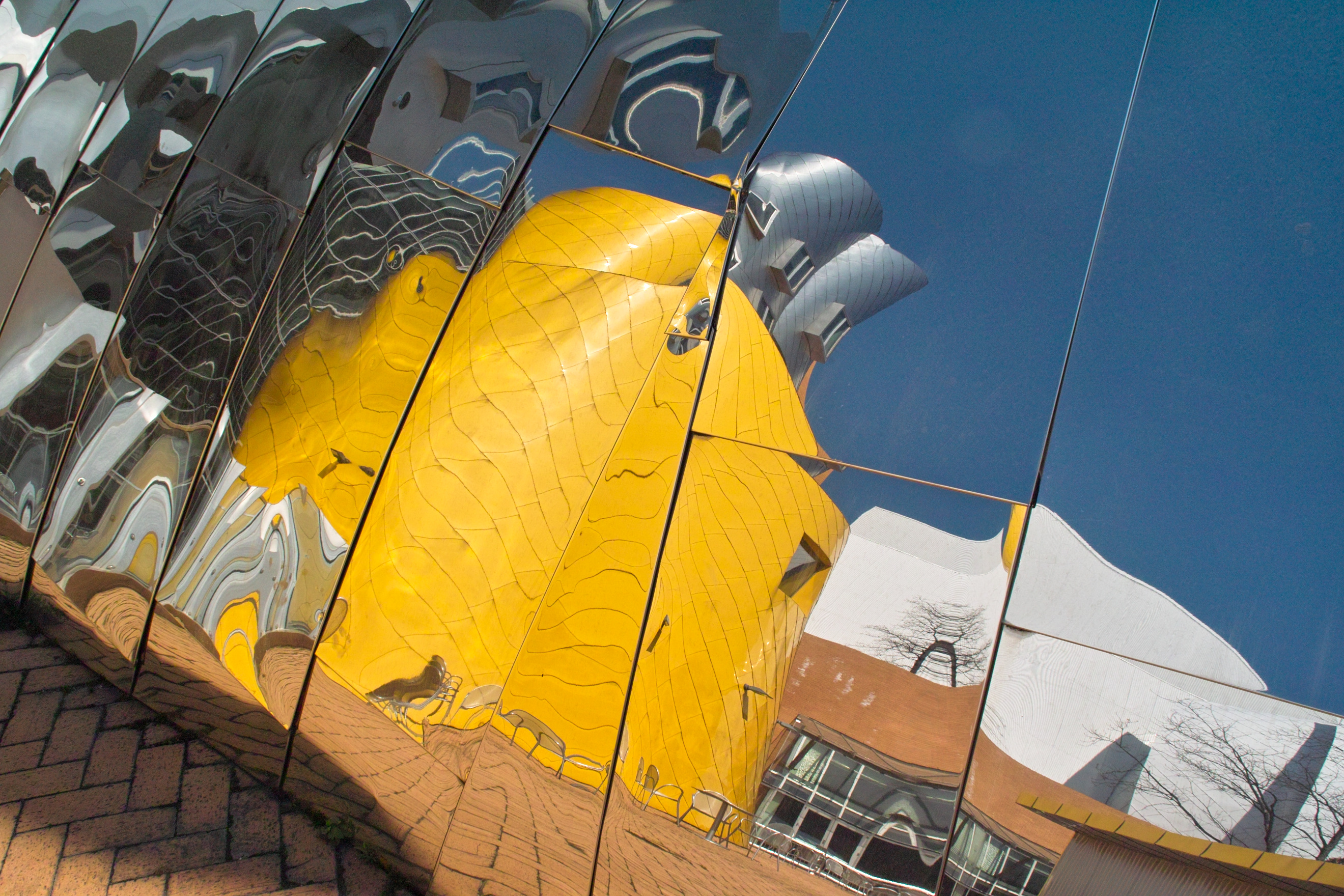
Stata Center self reflection

In contrast to the MIT custom of referring to buildings by their numbers rather than their official names, the complex is usually referred to as "Stata" or "the Stata Center" (though the building number is still essential in identifying rooms at MIT). Above the fourth floor, the building splits into two distinct structures: the Gates Tower and the Dreyfoos Tower, often called "G Tower" and "D Tower" respectively.

The building has a number of small auditoriums and classrooms used by the Electrical Engineering and Computer Science department (EECS, Course 6), as well as other departments and on-campus groups. Research labs and offices of the Computer Science and Artificial Intelligence Laboratory (CSAIL), the Laboratory for Information and Decision Systems (LIDS), as well as the Department of Linguistics and Philosophy (Course 24) occupy the upper floors. Academic celebrities such as Noam Chomsky, Ron Rivest, and World Wide Web Consortium founder Tim Berners-Lee also have offices in the building.

A wide main passage running the length of the building on the ground floor is called the Charles M. Vest Student Street, in honor of the former MIT president who died in December 2013. The Student Street is often used as a more-spacious substitute or extension for the Memorial Lobby located in Building 10 on the Infinite Corridor. The monthly "Choose to Re-use" community recycling swap fest, and a weekly fresh produce market are other events regularly held in the Stata Center. One of five MIT Technology Childcare Centers (TCC) is located at the western end of the ground floor. The Forbes Family Cafe is located at the eastern end, and serves coffee and lunch to the public during office hours.

The MIT Museum maintains some historic displays on the ground floor of the Stata Center. A few selected larger relics of past hacks (student pranks) are now on semi-permanent display, including a "fire hose" drinking fountain, a giant slide rule, and full-size replicas of a cow and a police car that had been placed atop the Great Dome (though not at the same time). In the ground floor elevator lobby of the Dreyfoos Tower are located a large time capsule box plus informational panels describing MIT's historic Building 20, which the Stata Center has replaced.

A large Digi-Comp II mechanical digital computer which operates with billiard balls is located in the ground floor elevator lobby of the Gates Tower. Also located there is Flow, a large multicolor art display created by Karl Sims (an MIT alumnus and MacArthur "genius"), which is activated by visitors' movements as detected by a Microsoft Kinect sensor.

Major funding for the Stata Center was provided by Ray Stata (MIT class of 1957) and Maria Stata. Bill Gates donated US$20 million, causing MIT to name one tower the "Gates Building." Other major funders included Alexander W. Dreyfoos Jr. (MIT class of 1954), CTP “Chuck” Hintze (an MIT graduate, and co-founder of JD Edwards, now Oracle Corporation), Morris Chang of TSMC, and Michael Dertouzos.

== History ==
The Stata Center is located on the site of the former Building 20, demolished in 1998. Building 20 had been erected hastily during World War II as a temporary building to house the historic Radiation Laboratory. Over the course of 55 years, its "temporary" nature allowed research groups to have more space, and to make more creative use of that space, than was possible in more respectable buildings. The building also provided permanent rooms for official Institute clubs and groups, including the Tech Model Railroad Club and the MIT Electronic Research Society (MITERS).

Professor Jerome Y. Lettvin once quipped, "You might regard it as the womb of the Institute. It is kind of messy, but by God it is procreative!"

== Architectural criticism ==
Robert Campbell, architecture columnist for The Boston Globe, wrote a glowing appraisal of the building on April 25, 2004. According to Campbell, "the Stata is always going to look unfinished. It also looks as if it's about to collapse. Columns tilt at scary angles. Walls teeter, swerve, and collide in random curves and angles. Materials change wherever you look: brick, mirror-surface steel, brushed aluminum, brightly colored paint, corrugated metal. Everything looks improvised, as if thrown up at the last moment. That's the point. The Stata's appearance is a metaphor for the freedom, daring, and creativity of the research that's supposed to occur inside it." Campbell stated that the cost overruns and delays in completion of the Stata Center are of no more importance than similar problems associated with the building of St Paul's Cathedral. The 2005 Kaplan/Newsweek guide How to Get into College, which lists twenty-five universities its editors consider notable in some respect, recognizes MIT as having the "hottest architecture", placing most of its emphasis on the Stata Center.

Though there are many who praise this building, and in fact from the perspective of Gehry's other work it is considered by some as one of his best, there are certainly many who are less enamored of the structure. Mathematician and architectural theorist Nikos Salingaros has harshly criticized the Stata Center:

An architecture that reverses structural algorithms so as to create disorder — the same algorithms that in an infinitely more detailed application generate living form—ceases to be architecture. Deconstructivist buildings are the most visible symbols of actual deconstruction. The randomness they embody is the antithesis of nature's organized complexity. This is despite effusive praise in the press for "exciting" new academic buildings, such as the Peter B. Lewis Management Building at Case Western Reserve University in Cleveland, the Vontz Center for Molecular Studies at the University of Cincinnati Medical Center, and the Stata Center for Computer, Information, and Intelligence Sciences at MIT, all by Frank Gehry. Housing a scientific department at a university inside the symbol of its nemesis must be the ultimate irony.

Former Boston University president John Silber said the building "really is a disaster". Architecture critic Robert Campbell praised Gehry for "break[ing] up the monotony of a street of concrete buildings" and being "a building like no other building". The style of the building has been likened to German Expressionism of the 1920s. The building has also been described as "reminiscent of a Dr. Seuss creation".

== Gallery ==
Stata Center

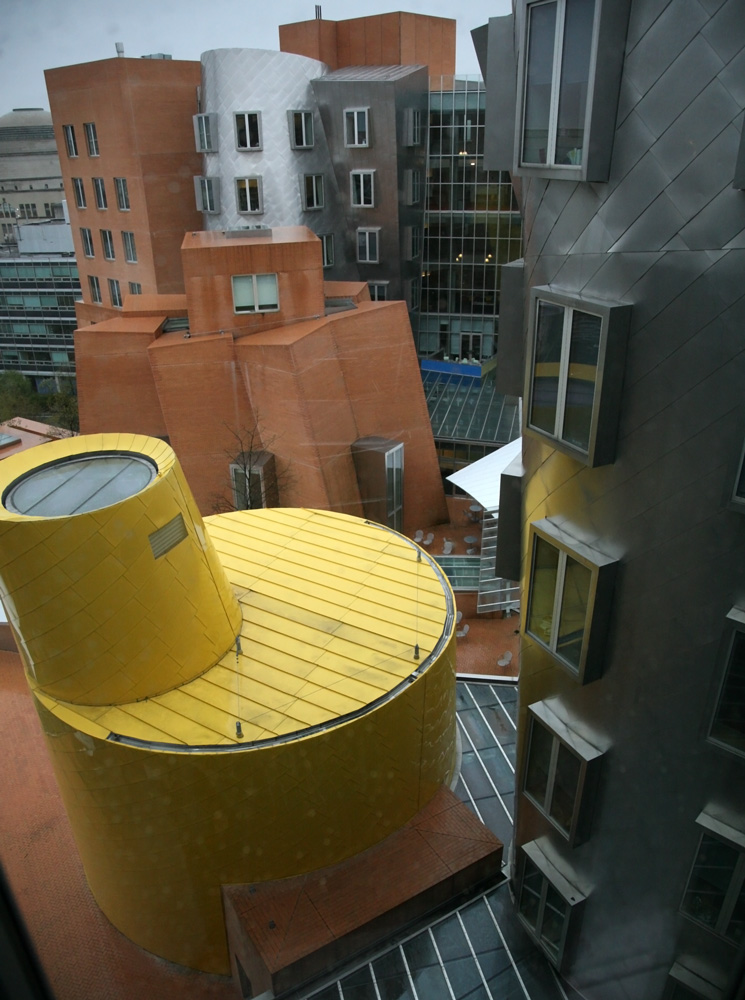
View from the 7th floor

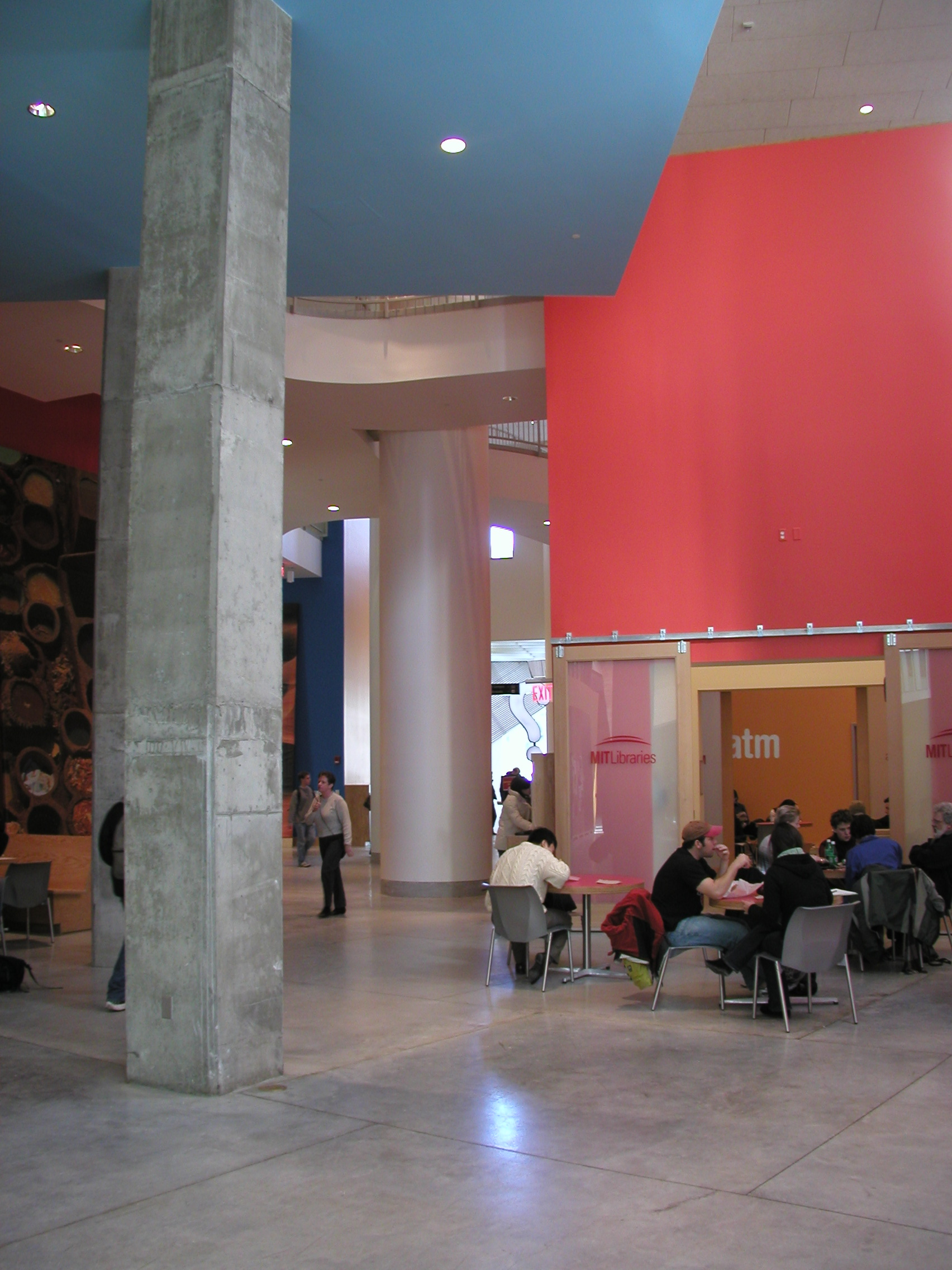
Interior, ground floor, Gates tower

Building 32 at night

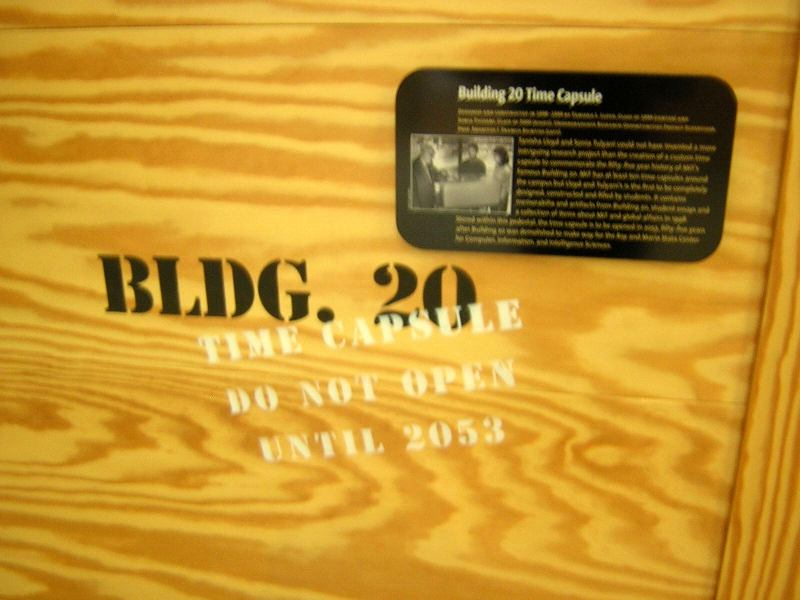
Building 20 time capsule, on display in the Stata Center

== Lawsuit ==
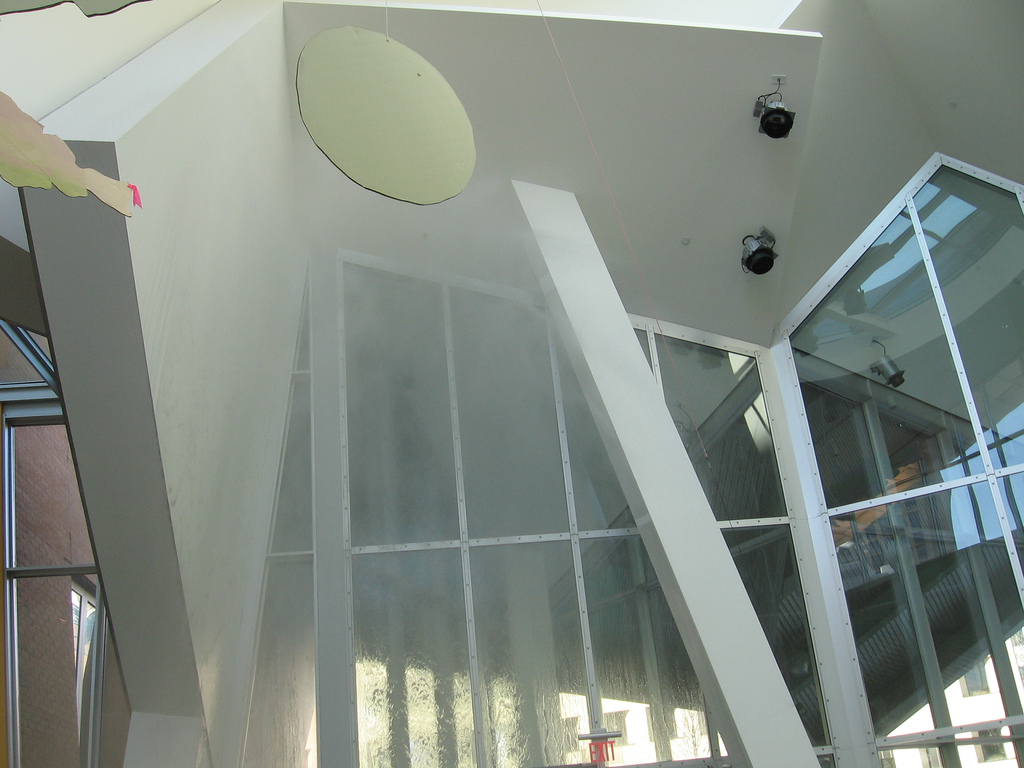
Water spray from a fire sprinkler system failure in 2007

On October 31, 2007, MIT sued architect Frank Gehry and the construction companies, Skanska USA Building Inc. and NER Construction Management, for "providing deficient design services and drawings" which caused leaks to spring, masonry to crack, mold to grow, drainage to back up, and falling ice and debris to block emergency exits. A Skanska spokesperson said that, prior to construction, Gehry ignored warnings from Skanska and a consulting company regarding flaws in his design of an outdoor amphitheater, and rejected a formal request from Skanska to modify the design.

In a 2007 interview, Gehry said the building was complicated and "involved a lot of people, and you never quite know where they went wrong. A building goes together with seven billion pieces of connective tissue. The chances of it getting done ever without something colliding or some misstep are small". Gehry additionally blamed value engineering, saying "There are things that were left out of the design[. ...] The client chose not to put certain devices on the roofs, to save money." He ultimately described the problems as minor and said MIT was "after our insurance".

The lawsuit was settled in 2010 with most of the issues having been resolved.

== Occupants ==
- Computer Science and Artificial Intelligence Laboratory (CSAIL)
  - World Wide Web Consortium
- Laboratory for Information and Decision Systems (LIDS)
- Department of Linguistics and Philosophy
- Childcare center
- Fitness center
- Forbes Cafe
- MIT Library Information Intersection cube

== See also ==
- List of works by Frank Gehry
- Marqués de Riscal Hotel, Spain
