= Don Valentine =

American venture capitalist (1932–2019)

Donald Thomas Valentine
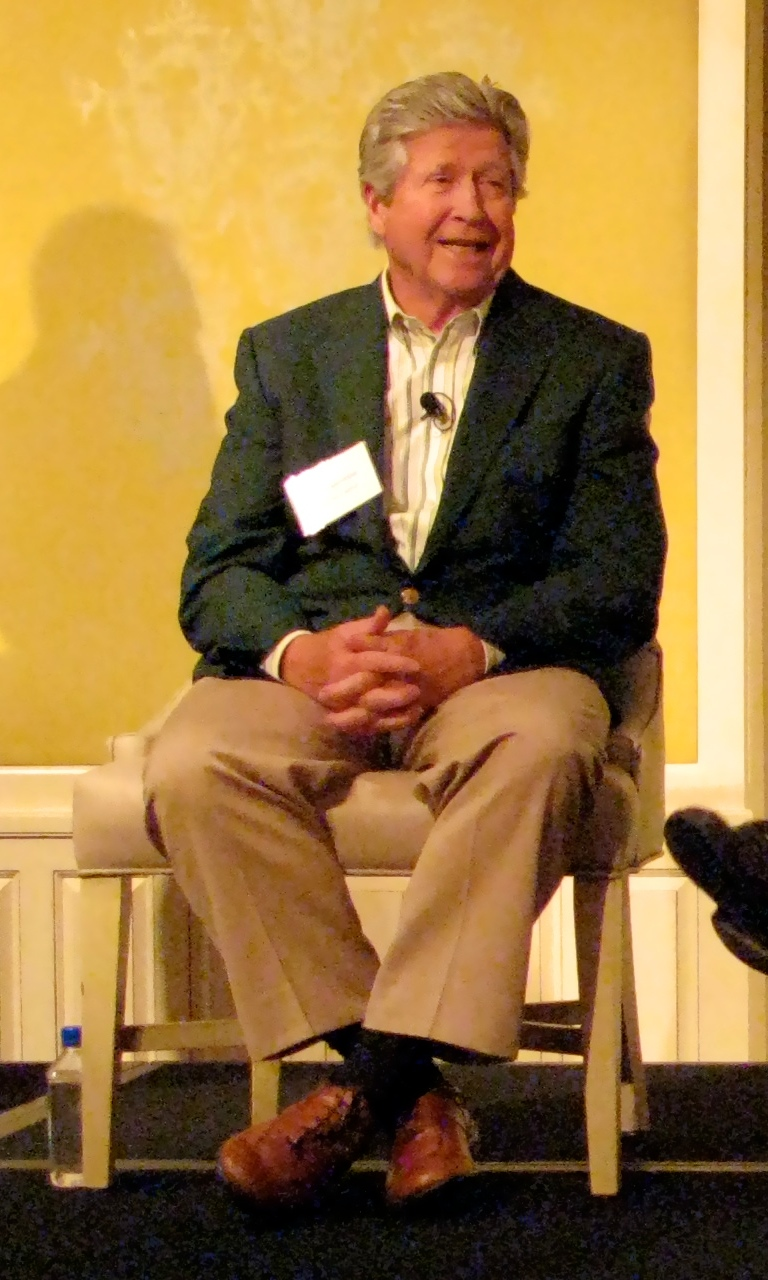
- Valentine in 2009
- Born: June 26, 1932; New York City, U.S.
- Died: October 25, 2019 (aged 87); Woodside, California, U.S.
- Education: Fordham University (BA)
- Occupation: Venture Capitalist

Donald Thomas Valentine (June 26, 1932 – October 25, 2019) was an American venture capitalist who was the founder of Sequoia Capital, with a concentration mainly on technology companies in the United States. Valentine was born and educated in New York City, and first came to California during military service, an experience that led him to remain in the region where he would later shape the venture capital industry.

Valentine was a major name for venture investing in Silicon Valley. Valentine was known for an investment style that emphasized large markets, early inflection points and humble founders, shaping Sequoia's reputation for discipline in early-stage technology investing. His approach to investing helped establish Sequoia Capital as an influential venture firm, backing companies such as Apple, Oracle, Cisco, Google, YouTube, NVIDIA, Airbnb, and WhatsApp.

== Early life and education ==
Valentine was born on June 26, 1932, in New York City, and grew up in the Bronx in a working class family. He was Catholic, and his family has a Danish background. He attended Mount Saint Michael Academy. Valentine’s parents had limited formal education, and his father worked on a milk route, while his mother was a homemaker. Valentine’s mother suffered from tuberculosis, with her treatment placing her in an iron lung and only allowing Valentine and his brother to wave at her through the hospital window.

When Valentine was preparing to go to college, he chose Fordham University because it was affordable and close to home, and he paid tuition quarterly in cash. He later said that his Jesuit education at Fordham influenced his analytical style and interrogative, Socratic method of questioning that he became known for as an investor. Valentine graduated with a B.A. from Fordham. He briefly served in the U.S. military after college, which brought him to California for the first time, influencing his decision to live there permanently.

== Early career ==
Valentine began his career as a sales engineer at Raytheon. He left and joined National Semiconductor, working as a senior sales and marketing executive. At Fairchild Semiconductor, Valentine managed worldwide sales during the acceleration of silicon-based integrated circuits and got early experience with semiconductor technology. Through continuous contact with early-stage chip customers, he started informally assessing young companies and developed instincts that would later attract him to venture investing.

Valentine said that the most transformational startups emerged at technological “inflection points” where industry disruption created openings for new entrants. His move to National Semiconductor gave him an opportunity to design a new sales strategy and contribute company's return to profitability, developing his understanding of how small tech firms scale.

== Founding of Sequoia Capital ==
In 1972, Valentine founded venture capital firm Sequoia Capital. Initially, the company focused on early venture investments with small, risky tech companies. When Valentine founded Sequoia, the venture capital industry in America was still in its infancy, with less than $50 million in the United States focused on early-stage technology investing. His goal was to build a firm that identified large markets early and backed companies capable of dominating them.

Sequoia's first investment was in Atari in 1975 before the company was sold for $28 million to Warner Communications. Sequoia was one of the original investors of Apple Computer and Atari after Valentine met Steve Jobs when he was a line engineer for Atari. In 1978, Sequoia invested $150,000 in Apple Inc. Sequoia Capital has also made early investments in companies including LSI Logic, Oracle Corporation, Cisco, Electronic Arts, Google, YouTube and many others. The early investments Valentine made became representative of the first wave of Silicon Valley success stories. When markets became volatile, as during the mid-1980s downturn, he insisted on disciplined spending and rigorous evaluation, helping Sequoia avoid the speculative excesses that damaged other firms.

== Investment philosophy ==
Valentine’s investing philosophy was anchored on his belief that, ultimately, markets, not founders, dictated a company’s scale. He looked for companies in their “confusion phases,” where large incumbents had not figured out how new technologies would reshape their industries. He liked entrepreneurs who “knew what they didn't know” and favored intellectual humility and adaptability to charisma.

With his famously blunt, demanding boardroom style, Valentine employed a Socratic questioning method to probe founders' assumptions, financial discipline, and strategic priorities. Valentine was often skeptical of hype-driven trends such as the early "Information Highway" rhetoric, which he saw as distractions from the real business applications. Valentine was known for demanding brevity in business plans. He once required an entrepreneur to rewrite an entire proposal onto the back of a business card. Valentine was also a proponent of Bay-area companies, preferring to invest in companies based in Northern California, arguing that leaving Silicon Valley meant leaving behind more opportunity than could be found elsewhere.

Valentine was a chairman of NetApp and Traiana. He served on the boards of many other technology companies including Apple, Atari, C-Cube, Cisco Systems, Electronic Arts, Linear Technology, LSI Logic, Microchip Technology, Oracle, PMC-Sierra. Valentine was featured in the documentary film Something Ventured which premiered in 2011, which investigated the emergence of American venture capitalism in the mid-20th century.

Although best known for the major successes made by Sequoia, Valentine also made some unsuccessful investments. Valentine’s backing of Pizza Time Theatre, which overexpanded before failing, together with a string of poorly performing retail and grocery investments, led to him preferring the quickly growing technology markets over the generally slower consumer sectors.

== Legacy ==
Valentine has been recognized as one of the key individuals who created the modern venture capital industry. During his tenure, Sequoia Capital became a successful technology investment firm, backing companies such as Google, YouTube, PayPal, NVIDIA, Airbnb, LinkedIn, Zappos, Square, Stripe, and WhatsApp. As the founder of Sequoia Capital, he has been referred to as the "grandfather of Silicon Valley venture capital." The Computer History Museum credited him as playing "a key role in the formation of a number of industries such as semiconductors, personal computers, personal computer software, digital entertainment and networking."

Empirical research places Sequoia in that small group of elite VC firms that consistently outperform market averages in all key dimensions: better IPO outcomes, market share, and more effective governance. Valentine’s disciplined, market focused approach influenced later generations of Sequoia partners, including Michael Moritz and Alfred Lin, who helped carry the firm’s philosophy into new eras of technology and global expansion.

Internationally, the structure and approach to investing by Sequoia Capital, largely shaped by Valentine, have extended into areas such as artificial intelligence and digital media, with Sequoia Capital China backing major global companies such as ByteDance. Journalists have described Valentine as tough, deeply knowledgeable, and uncompromising in his expectations, crediting him with shaping Silicon Valley’s standards for company building and board governance.

== Death ==
Valentine died on October 25, 2019, in Woodside, California, at the age of 87. He is survived by three children and seven grandchildren who all live in the Bay Area.
