= Bob Dobkin =

American electrical engineer

- Born: Robert C. Dobkin; 1943 (age 82–83); Philadelphia, Pennsylvania
- Occupation: Electronics engineer
- Known for: Integrated circuits designer and electronics entrepreneur

Robert C. Dobkin (born 1943 in Philadelphia) is an American electrical engineer, co-founder of Linear Technology Corporation, and veteran linear (analog) integrated circuit (IC) designer. He has over 100 patents.

== Career ==
Dobkin studied Electrical Engineering at MIT, but did not complete a degree. After early employments e.g. at GE Reentry Systems, he joined Philbrick Nexus in Massachusetts working on IC development with Bob Pease. He joined National Semiconductor (NSC) in January 1969. He resigned the position as Director of Advanced Circuit Development at NSC in July 1981 and co-founded Linear Technology with Robert H. Swanson in the same year.

Dobkin continued to serve as the company's Chief Technical Officer through its acquisition by Analog Devices in 2016. He was on the board of directors of Spectra7 Microsystems Inc. from 2013 until his retirement in 2021.

Dobkin holds more than 100 patents in the field of analog circuits.

In 2021 Dobkin was charged by the SEC with insider trading for sharing non-public information regarding the merger of Analog Devices and Linear Technology. Dobkin was found guilty and ordered to pay a fine of $252,092.16 and barred from serving as an officer or director of a publicly traded company.

== Works ==
- LM118, first high speed operational amplifier.
- LM199, heated buried-Zener voltage reference, and its improved successor, the LTZ1000.
- LM317, first variable three-pin voltage regulator.
- LT1083, first low-dropout regulator.
- LT3080, three terminal adjustable regulator with a current source reference.
