= E. Floyd Kvamme =

American businessman

Floyd Kvamme
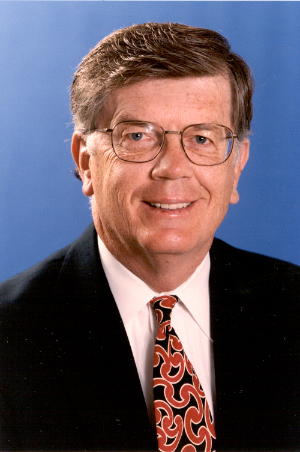
- Born: Earl Floyd Kvamme; 1938 (age 87–88)
- Education: University of California, Berkeley (BS); Syracuse University (MS)
- Political party: Republican

Earl Floyd Kvamme (born 1938) is an American engineer, venture capitalist, and government advisor.

== Early life ==
The son of Norwegian immigrant parents, Kvamme grew up in Northern California graduating from Jefferson High School of Daly City in 1955. He earned a BS in Electrical Engineering from the University of California, Berkeley in 1959 and an MS in Semiconductor Materials Science and Engineering from Syracuse University in 1962.

== Career ==
In 1967, Kvamme was one of the original members of a team to establish new National Semiconductor headquarters in Silicon Valley. In 1982, Kvamme became Executive Vice President of Sales and Marketing for Apple Computer. While at Apple, he was instrumental in deciding to air the 1984 advertisement. He has been a director (and later Partner Emeritus) at venture capital firm Kleiner, Perkins, Caufield & Byers since March 1984. In the corporate world he has served on the boards of Brio Technology, Gemfire, Harmonic, National Semiconductor, Photon Dynamics, Power Integrations, and Silicon Genesis.

In the public realm, he is best known for his appointment by President George W. Bush to be Co-Chairman of the President's Council of Advisors on Science and Technology (PCAST) in 2001; Kvamme has also advised every president from Ronald Reagan to George W. Bush. Kvamme previously served as Chairman of advocacy group Empower America. He serves on the board of the National Venture Capital Association. In 1998, Kvamme served as Chairman of the California State Electronic Commerce Advisory Council for Governor Pete Wilson's administration.

Kvamme came out in support of Rudy Giuliani in his 2008 US Presidential Campaign. In 2012, Kvamme supported Rick Perry in his US Presidential Campaign, and was a member of his California finance team.

== Bibliography ==
- 'Chapter 19: How Technology Can Lead a Boom', in The 4% Solution: Unleashing the Economic Growth America Needs, Brendan Miniter (ed.), George W. Bush Institute, New York: Crown Business, 2012, pp 261–278.
