= Jack Gifford =

American engineer and businessman

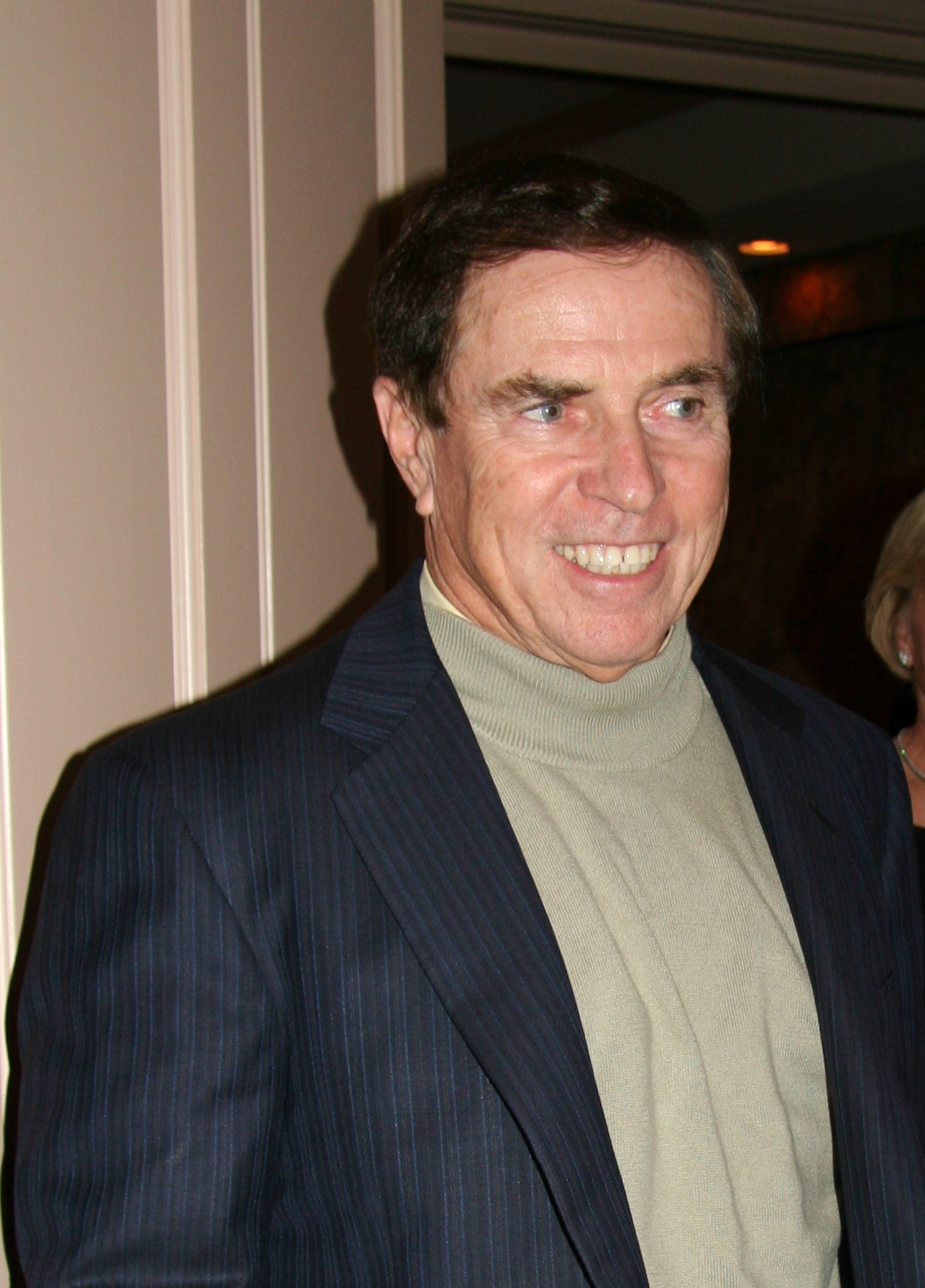
- Born: January 11, 1941
- Died: January 11, 2009 (aged 68)
- Education: University of California, Los Angeles
- Occupations: Semiconductor company founder and executive

John "Jack" F. Gifford (January 11, 1941 – January 11, 2009) was an American engineer and businessman best known as a founder and former CEO, President and Chairman of the Board of Maxim Integrated Products, an analog and mixed signal semiconductor company, located in San Jose, California. He served as the company's CEO until his retirement in 2007.

== Life and career ==
Gifford was born in 1941 and graduated from Banning High School in Los Angeles, California. He attended the University of California, Los Angeles (UCLA) on a baseball scholarship and wanted to play professionally. However, Gifford had married his high school sweetheart at age eighteen and realized he could not play baseball and support his wife and child. He graduated from UCLA with a BSEE degree in 1963. He was a Christian.

Gifford's first job upon graduating from college was as a design engineer at Electronic Specialties in Los Angeles. He was soon recruited by Fairchild Semiconductor, at the age of 24. At Fairchild, Gifford worked his way up from the lower management levels to become the company's first Director of Analog Products. In 1968, Gifford co-founded Advanced Micro Devices (AMD) and served as the company's Vice President of Marketing and Planning. Gifford left Advanced Micro Devices to begin a career in farming. Shortly after, he was persuaded to consult on a part-time basis at Intersil in the analog division, while continuing his farming. Eventually, Gifford left farming to assume the full-time position as Vice President of the Analog Division and later CEO of Intersil. At Intersil, Gifford was instrumental in the development of low power CMOS for analog applications, which became one of the largest analog IC markets in the world. Gifford is considered to be one of the "founding fathers" on the analog microchip industry.

In 1983, Gifford co-founded Maxim Integrated Products and led the company as CEO and President for the next 24 years. He developed a culture of high expectations with an emphasis on innovation. At Maxim, he devised a list of thirteen principles, known as the Maxim Principles, to define the company's culture. By 2007, when Gifford retired as Maxim's Chairman, CEO and President, Maxim had over 10,000 employees and reported revenues over $2 Billion. The Securities and Exchange Commission had been investigating the company for back-dating stock options since June 2006. A few months after Gifford retired, the CFO resigned and the company was delisted as it restated earnings for 2000 through 2005.

Gifford maintained a passion for baseball throughout his life. In 1994, he founded, sponsored and played for the Maxim Yankees, a semi-pro wood bat baseball team. He also supported several college baseball programs – Stanford, California, Santa Clara University, San Jose State University and UCLA. At UCLA, he funded and oversaw the construction of the Jack and Rhodine Gifford Hitting Facility, a 10,500-square-foot (980 m^{2}) practice facility at Jackie Robinson Stadium.

Married for nearly 49 years, Gifford had three daughters and eleven grandchildren. Gifford died on his 68th birthday of a heart attack, in Kamuela, Hawaii.

== Honors and awards ==
- 1988 – Nominated for the National Entrepreneur of the Year award by Arthur Young
- 1990 – Elected to the UCLA Baseball Hall of Fame
- 1991 – Named Alumnus of the Year of the UCLA College of Engineering
- 1992 – Commencement Speaker at the 1992 UCLA College of Engineering Graduation Ceremony
- 2001 – Named CEO of the Year by Electronic Business Magazine
- 2004 – Oldest player ever to participate in the National Baseball Congress World Series
- 2005 – Named America's Best Semiconductor Industry CEO by Institutional Investor Magazine
- 2007 – Commencement Speaker at the University of Hawaii, Hilo
- 2007 – Received the Degree of Doctor of Humane Letters, honoris causa, from the University of Hawaii, Hilo
- 2008 – Recipient of the Special Service Award from the Santa Clara County, Hot Stove Baseball Society
