= Charles E. Sporck =

American engineer (1927–2024)

Charles E. Sporck (November 15, 1927 – October 12, 2024) was an American engineer and company manager. He was best known for his role as chief executive officer and president of National Semiconductor from 1967 to 1991. The New York Times described Sporck as "a founding father of Silicon Valley".

== Education and early career ==
Sporck was born in Saranac Lake, New York, in 1927. Sporck studied mechanical engineering at Cornell University, graduating with a bachelor's degree in 1950. He then worked for General Electric.

He started work at semiconductor division of Fairchild Camera and Instrument in 1959, where he rose to the position of General Manager.

== At National Semiconductor ==
In 1967, Sporck was recruited by National Semiconductor, which was at that time struggling financially. Under his leadership the company focused on mass production of low cost computer chips and became very successful; for a time the company was "the largest chip maker in Silicon Valley".

The company's fortunes declined in the 1980s when more competitively priced chips manufactured in Asia entered the American domestic market. He retired in 1991, and was succeeded by Gilbert F. Amelio.

== Death ==
Sporck died on October 12, 2024, at the age of 96.
