= National Semiconductor =

American semiconductor manufacturer

National Semiconductor Corporation
- Type: Public
- Traded as: Nasdaq: NSM
- Industry: Semiconductors
- Founded: May 27, 1959; 67 years ago in Danbury, Connecticut, United States
- Defunct: September 23, 2011; 15 years ago
- Fate: Acquired by Texas Instruments
- Headquarters: Santa Clara, California, United States
- Key people: Donald Macleod, Chairman & CEO
- Products: Semiconductors
- Revenue: ▲$1.42 billion USD (2010)
- Operating income: ▲$325.8 million USD (2010)
- Net income: ▲$209.2 million USD (2010)
- Number of employees: 5,800 (2010)
- Website: https://nationalsemiconductor.com/

National Semiconductor Corporation was an American semiconductor manufacturer, which specialized in analog devices and subsystems, formerly headquartered in Santa Clara, California. The company produced power management integrated circuits, display drivers, audio and operational amplifiers, communication interface products and data conversion solutions. National's key markets included wireless handsets, displays and a variety of broad electronics markets, including medical, automotive, industrial and test and measurement applications.

On September 23, 2011, the company formally became part of Texas Instruments as the "Silicon Valley" division.

== History ==
=== Founding ===
National Semiconductor was founded in Danbury, Connecticut, by Dr. Bernard J. Rothlein on May 27, 1959, when he and seven colleagues, Edward N. Clarke, Joseph J. Gruber, Milton Schneider, Robert L. Hopkins, Robert L. Koch, Richard R. Rau and Arthur V. Siefert, left their employment at the semiconductor division of Sperry Rand Corporation.

The founding of the new company was followed by Sperry Rand filing a lawsuit against National Semiconductor for patent infringement. By 1965, as it was reaching the courts, the preliminaries of the lawsuit had caused the stock value of National to be depressed. The depressed stock values allowed Peter J Sprague to invest heavily in the company with Sprague's family funds. Sprague also relied on further financial backing from a pair of West Coast investment firms and a New York underwriter to take control as the chairman of National Semiconductor. At that time Sprague was 27 years old. Jeffrey S. Young characterized the era as the beginning of venture capitalism.

That same year National Semiconductor acquired Molectro. Molectro was founded in 1962 in Santa Clara, California, by J. Nall and D. Spittlehouse, who were formerly employed at Fairchild Semiconductor. The acquisition brought in two experts in linear semiconductor technologies, Robert Widlar and Dave Talbert, who were also formerly employed at Fairchild. The acquisition of Molectro provided National with the technology to launch itself in the fabrication and manufacture of monolithic integrated circuits.

In 1965, with at least 500 shareholders and on the cusp of bankruptcy, National Semiconductor went "marginally" publicly traded through Pink Sheets at a starting price of $3. Alan Lopato was the market maker with a list of significant shareholders.

Due to Rothlein's lack of belief in integrated circuits, and before Sporck was hired, Jack Hegarty replaced Dr Rothlein as CEO, and Don Lucas became chairman, immediately followed by Peter Sprague becoming chairman.

In 1966, Sprague hired five top executives away from Fairchild, among whom were Charles E. Sporck, Pierre Lamond, Don Valentine, Floyd Kvamme. At the time of Sporck's hiring, Robert Noyce was de facto head of semiconductor operations at Fairchild and Sporck was his operations manager. Sporck was appointed president and CEO of National. To make the deal better for Sporck's hiring and appointment at half his former salary at Fairchild, Sporck was allotted a substantial share of National's stock. Sporck also brought over three other people from TI, Perkin-Elmer, and Hewlett-Packard to form a new eight-man team at National Semiconductor. The group was allotted 9.6% of the company's stock and after the deal was announced, the stock soared from $3-$4 to $24. Sporck had been Widlar's superior at Fairchild before Widlar left Fairchild to join Molectro after a compensation dispute with Sporck.

In 1968, National shifted its headquarters from Danbury, Connecticut, to Santa Clara, California. However, like many companies, National retained its registration as a Delaware corporation, for legal and financial expediency.

Over the years National Semiconductor acquired several companies like Fairchild Semiconductor (1987), and Cyrix (1997). However, over time National Semiconductor spun off these acquisitions. Fairchild Semiconductor became a separate company again in 1997, and the Cyrix microprocessors division was sold to VIA Technologies of Taiwan in 1999.

From 1997 to 2002, National enjoyed a large amount of publicity and awards with the development of the Cyrix Media Center, Cyrix WebPad, WebPad Metro and National Origami PDA concept devices created by National's Conceptual Products Group. Based largely on the success of the WebPad, National formed the Information Appliance Division (highly integrated processors & "internet gadgets") in 1998. The Information Appliance Division was sold to AMD in 2003.

Other businesses dealing in such products as digital wireless chipsets, image sensors, and PC I/O chipsets have also been recently closed down or sold off as National has reincarnated itself as a high-performance analog semiconductor company.

=== The transformation of National Semiconductor ===
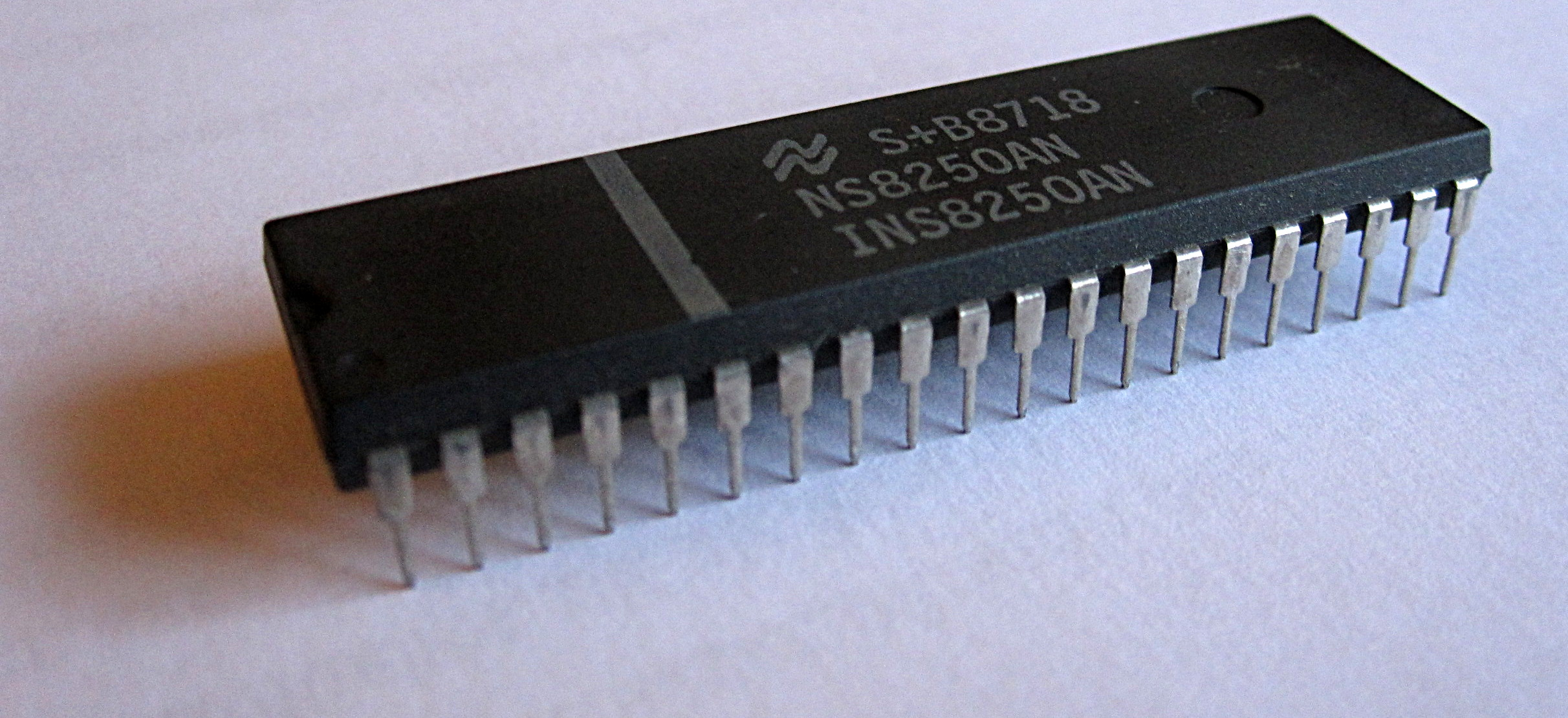
The National Semiconductor 8250 UART chip, one of the most prolific and most cloned UART chips due to its presence in the first IBM Personal Computer

Peter Sprague, Pierre Lamond and the affectionately called Charlie Sporck worked hand-in-hand, with support of the board of directors to transform the company into a multinational and world-class semiconductor concern. Immediately after becoming CEO, Sporck started a historic price war among semiconductor companies, which then trimmed the number of competitors in the field. Among the casualties to exit the semiconductor business were General Electric and Westinghouse.

Cost control, overhead reduction and a focus on profits implemented by Sporck was the key element to National surviving the price war and subsequently in 1981 becoming the first semiconductor company to reach the US$1 billion annual sales mark. However, the foundation that made National successful was its expertise in analog electronics, TTL (transistor–transistor logic) and MOSFET (metal–oxide–semiconductor field-effect transistor) integrated circuit technologies. As they had while employed in Fairchild, Sporck and Lamond directed National Semiconductor towards the growing industrial and commercial markets and began to rely less on military and aerospace contracts. Those decisions coupled with inflationary growth in use of computers provided the market for the expansion of National. Meanwhile, sources of funds associated with Sprague coupled with creative structuring of cash flow buffering due to Sporck and Lamond provided the financing required for that expansion. Lamond and Sporck had also managed to attract and extract substantial funds to finance the expansion.

Among Sporck's cost control efforts was his offshore outsourcing of labour. National Semiconductor was among the pioneers in the semiconductor industry to invest in facilities to perform final manufacturing operations of integrated circuits in developing countries, especially in Southeast Asia.

National Semiconductor's manufacturing improvements under Sporck (in collaboration with Lamond) was enabled not by emphasizing process innovation but by improving and standardizing processes already established by other companies like Fairchild and Texas Instruments, as well as by frequent raiding to hire from Fairchild's pool of talents.

=== Weaknesses of Sporck's leadership ===
National Semiconductor under Sporck was not particularly invested in marketing strategies, even though it had the vision to launch itself into new and apparent opportunities in the consumer market. Sporck had applied strategies that made National Semiconductor function as a low-cost mass manufacturer of semiconductor commodities.

A few key executives and engineers left the company in 1981. Among them was Pierre Lamond, who had been the chief IC designer. Robert Swanson's departure in the same year to found Linear Technology was another indication of the appropriateness of organisational strategies of National Semiconductor under Sporck. "For 13 of 14 years at National, I was a gung-ho guy. Then, the company started to get big. I kept looking at all the companies whose butts we'd been kicking. And then National started organizing itself like them. It was frustrating." Swanson said in the May 13, 1991, Business Journal-San Jose.

Sporck's strategy of outsourcing sales to external sources meant National Semiconductor did not have sufficient or responsive resources to respond to requests from innovators, inventors and academic research—which would have been helpful in the technological innovation boom of the 1980s.

National Semiconductor's lack and loss of innovation meant it was producing products that were easily copied and reproducible. It may have been the cheapest manufacturer in the United States, but it was not the cheapest compared to the Asian manufacturers. This weakness in National Semiconductor was evident in its failure to compete during the globalisation of Japanese semiconductor companies in the 1980s, followed by globalisation of Taiwanese and South Korean companies.

=== Leadership under Gilbert F. Amelio ===
On May 27, 1991, Charles E. Sporck was replaced by Gil Amelio as CEO and president. Amelio was then president of Rockwell International's semiconductor division and had a Ph.D. in physics from Georgia Institute of Technology. Amelio had also been formerly employed at Fairchild.

Amelio was faced with a company plagued with over-capacity and shrinking market share. Amelio found that, just prior to his taking helm, despite having spent US$1 billion over the last five years on research and development, National Semiconductor had a disappointing record in new products. The Business section of The New York Times January 11, 1991, reflected the over-capacity generated by Sporck that had to be inherited by Amelio.

Amelio disposed of the non-core products and assets in which National Semiconductor had no market motivation or expertise and turned the company towards its core expertise—analog semiconductors. National Semiconductor under Amelio emphasized on reduction of cost of sales, improving capacity utilization, scrap reduction and cycle-time reduction. Redundant facilities were sold and consolidated.

With the progress of restructuring, National Semiconductor increased revenues each year. In 1994, National Semiconductor under Amelio posted record net revenues of US$2.29 billion. It was also a time when US semiconductor companies had regained market leadership. Amelio introduced benchmarking to evaluate productivity, restructured marketing strategies and reorganised management by introducing modern management practices and workplace environments.

Amelio divided products into two divisions: Standard Products Group which comprised low-margin, logic and memory chips—commodity products which were more susceptible to cyclical demands and through which National Semiconductor had matured; and Communications & Computing Group which comprised high-margin, value-added analog and mixed-signal chips. Amelio's division of products seemed to prepare National Semiconductor for the eventual disposal of low-margin commodity products, which came to fruition later with the sale of a reconstituted Fairchild.

National Semiconductor under Amelio chose to build a brand new eight-inch (200 mm) wafer fabrication plant in South Portland, Maine. It chose to divest itself of its then somewhat new plant in Migdal HaEmek, Israel, which became Tower Semiconductor.

In 1995, Amelio was elected as the chairman of the board of directors of National Semiconductor.

In 1996, Amelio accepted an invitation from Apple Computer, a customer of National Semiconductor, to join its board of directors. Troubles at Apple later prompted the board to invite Amelio to take on the position of CEO, which he accepted in February 1996. National Semiconductor announced the resignation of Amelio as the company's president, chairman and chief executive officer on February 2, 1996.

=== Leadership under Brian L. Halla ===
National Semiconductor announced the appointment of Brian L. Halla as its chairman, president and CEO on May 3, 1996. Halla was then the head of LSI logic products division. Prior to LSI, he had been with Intel for 14 years.

Halla reinforced Amelio's emphasis on the expertise of National Semiconductor in analog technology. He also was, on occasions, an evangelist for analog technology. However, he found that National Semiconductor under Amelio had too few product offerings. Halla embarked on a diversification into personal computer and graphics business.

He advocated PC-on-a-chip (aka system-on-a-chip) as a business direction for National Semiconductor. During his tenure at LSI, LSI had successfully applied similar concepts. However, LSI had steered clear of getting involved with PC technologies that would make it a competitor with Intel. Halla held the vision that information appliances (IAs) would succeed the personal computer as a trend. He predicted that IAs would overtake sales of PCs by the year 2000.

To achieve the goal, National Semiconductor started acquiring companies that would provide the needed technological complements. Among the acquisitions were Cirrus Logic Inc's PicoPower business, for its specialised expertise in small form factor devices; Mediamatics Inc, which makes multimedia connectivity products; Future Integrated Systems Inc, a PC graphics company; Gulbransen Inc, a digital audio technology maker; ComCore Semiconductor Inc, a maker of digital signal processing for LANs; Cyrix, the maker of Intel x86 clones.

On March 11, 1997, National Semiconductor Corporation announced the US$550 million sale of a reconstituted Fairchild to the management of Fairchild with the backing of Sterling LLC, a unit of Citicorp Venture Capital. Fairchild carried with it what was mostly the Standard Products group previously segregated by Amelio. Incidentally, the effective price of acquisition of Cyrix was also US$550 million.

On November 17, 1997, National Semiconductor and Cyrix announced the merger of the companies. Cyrix would become an autonomous wholly owned subsidiary. Halla had earlier emphasized that National was after the low-end CPU market as part of the system-on-a-chip pursuit and therefore would not place emphasis on Cyrix's current development of high-end 6x86MX design. However, Cyrix later announced that its merger with National Semiconductor would not change its development or marketing plans.

The acquisition of an independent-minded Cyrix subsequently turned National Semiconductor from a collaborator into a competitor with Intel. National lost its business with Intel. Intel reinstated the relationship after the sale of Cyrix.

The acquisition of Cyrix also carried with it a business obligation to use the IBM Microelectronics Division to fabricate the Cyrix chips, as well as technical constraint to do the same, while National Semiconductor had plans to transfer their fabrication to its South Portland fab. National incurred huge losses in its processor business and announced the sale of Cyrix to VIA in 1999.

In 1999, National Semiconductor also put out feelers for selling if not the whole, then a majority stake of, its fabrication plant in South Portland, Maine. However, that did not come to fruition.

On June 28, 2000, National Semiconductor and TSMC Taiwan signed an agreement that would allow transfer of advanced fabrication technologies from TSMC to the National Semiconductor fabrication plant in South Portland, Maine.

On March 11, 2009, National announced plans to close its assembly and test plant in Suzhou, China, and its wafer fabrication plant in Arlington, Texas.

On October 9, 2009, Brian Halla announced his retirement as National's CEO. He remains executive chairman. The company promoted Donald (Don) Macleod, who had previously served as the company's president and chief operating officer, to CEO.

=== Leadership under Donald Macleod ===
Don Macleod became National Semiconductor's chief executive officer on November 30, 2009. He was named chairman of the board on May 31, 2010.

=== Acquisition by Texas Instruments ===
On April 4, 2011, Texas Instruments announced that it had agreed to buy National Semiconductor for $6.5 billion in cash. Texas Instruments paid $25 per share of National Semiconductor stock, an 80% premium over the April 4, 2011, closing share price of $14.07. The deal made Texas Instruments one of the world's largest makers of analog technology components. On September 19, 2011, the Chinese minister approved the merger, the last one needed. The companies formally merged on September 23, 2011.

== Manufacturing locations ==
History of manufacturing locations
Year	Comments
1967	Test operations started in Hong Kong.
1969	Manufacturing operations started in Greenock, Scotland; Fürstenfeldbruck, Germany; and Singapore. Acquired lead-frame manufacturer DynaCraft.
1972	Assembly and test operations started in the two Malaysia states of Malacca and Penang.
1975	Final-manufacturing operations were started in Bangkok, Thailand and Bandung, Indonesia.
1976	Assembly and test operations started in Manila, Philippines.
1976	Started its first then state-of-the-art four-inch wafer fabrication operation in West Jordan, a suburb of Salt Lake City, Utah.
1979	Opened its assembly plant for high reliability components used in aerospace applications in Tucson, Arizona.
1985	Six-inch wafer fabrication operation started in Arlington, Texas.
1987	Acquired Fairchild Semiconductor Corporation from Schlumberger. Inherited facilities housing Fairchild's headquarters and wafer fabrication operations in South Portland, Maine.
1989	Facilities in Danbury, Connecticut closed.
1990	Consolidated Singapore manufacturing operations in Bukit Merah district into Fairchild's Toa Payoh facilities.
1990	Sold Fairchild facilities at Puyallup, Washington to Matsushita Electric Industrial Company.
1992	Closed assembly operations in Tucson, Arizona. Retained the site as a design center.
1995	Sold DynaCraft (with locations in Santa Clara, California; Murrysville, Pennsylvania; and Penang, Malaysia) to Carsem Enterprises, the semiconductor division of Malaysia Pacific Industries.
1996	The construction of a ~$932 million eight-inch fabrication plant started in a location abutting formerly Fairchild facilities in South Portland.
1997	Eight-inch wafer fabrication operations became fully functional.
1997	National Semiconductor executives led by Kirk Pond, who was also an executive of the former Fairchild, acquired funding to buy a reconstituted Fairchild Semiconductor for US$550 million. The reconstitution was characterised by the new Fairchild being allotted the formerly National Semiconductor locations at Penang (Malaysia), Cebu (Philippines), West Jordan/Salt Lake City (Utah) while National retained the formerly Fairchild location of Toa Payoh (Singapore).
2002	Started construction of $200 million final-manufacturing operations plant in Suzhou, Jiangsu, China.
2004	Started final-manufacturing operations in Suzhou, China.
2005	Closed final-manufacturing operations in Toa Payoh, Singapore. Transferred all manufacturing operations to Melaka, Malaysia and Suzhou, China.
2009	Closed final-manufacturing operations in Suzhou, China and wafer fabrication plant in Arlington, Texas. Transferred all final-manufacturing operations to Melaka, Malaysia and wafer fabrication to South Portland, Maine and Greenock, Scotland.
2011	Acquired by Texas Instruments on September 23, 2011.

National Semiconductor also had operations in Migdal (tower) Ha'Emeq (valley), Israel. National Semiconductor had six inch (152 mm) wafer fabrication operations there. In 1993, National Semiconductor divested to retain 19% ownership of the plant. The plant in Migdal Ha'Emeq, Israel is now constituted as Tower Semiconductor of Israel.

== Products ==
- analog circuits
  - operational amplifiers
  - buffers
  - comparators
  - integrated circuits
  - regulators
  - voltage references
- audio circuits
- microcontrollers
- network products
- data converters
- interface circuits
- display technology
- temperature sensors
- simple switcher

== History of National Semiconductor logo and product identification ==

National Semiconductor "NS" monogram (top) and wave (bottom) logos used on chip markings

The following picture excerpts illustrate the history of identification marks of National Semiconductor.

National Semiconductor logo during the time of Charlie Sporck.
From an old National Semiconductor calculator.

National Semiconductor logo during the latter time of Charlie Sporck till the time of Gil Amelio.
From an IC manufactured during the time of Gil Amelio.

Most recent/current National Semiconductor identification.
From a National Semiconductor brochure.

== See also ==
- National Semiconductor microprocessors
- NS320xx
- NE2000
- Hitachi Data Systems
- Bob Pease, designer of the LM331 and LM337 among others
- Bob Widlar inventor of the Widlar current source
- List of LM-series integrated circuits
- List of semiconductor fabrication plants
- EE Power
