= Linear Technology =

American semiconductor manufacturer

Linear Technology Corporation
- Founded: 1981
- Founder: Robert H. Swanson, Jr. Robert C. Dobkin
- Defunct: March 10, 2017
- Fate: Acquired by Analog Devices
- Headquarters: Milpitas, California, U.S.
- Number of locations: 12 (10 U.S. design centers, Munich and Singapore)
- Key people: Lothar Maier (CEO), Robert H. Swanson, Jr. (Chairman), Robert C. Dobkin (CTO)
- Products: Over 7500 products
- Revenue: ▲US$1,475 million (2015); ▲US$1,388 million (2014)
- Operating income: ▲US$682 million (2015); ▲US$639 million (2014)
- Net income: ▲US$520 million (2015); ▲US$459 million (2014)
- Total assets: ▲US$1,884 million (2015); ▼US$1,655 million (2014)
- Total equity: ▲US$1,577 million (2015); ▲US$1,331 million (2014)
- Number of employees: 4,865 (June 2015)

Linear Technology Corporation was an American semiconductor company that designed, manufactured and marketed high performance analog integrated circuits. Applications for the company's products included telecommunications, cellular telephones, networking products, notebook and desktop computers, video/multimedia, industrial instrumentation, automotive electronics, factory automation, process control, as well as military and space systems. The company was founded in 1981 by Robert H. Swanson Jr. and Robert C. Dobkin.

In July 2016, Analog Devices agreed to buy Linear Technology for 14.8 billion dollars. This acquisition was finalized on March 10, 2017. The Linear name survives as the "Power by Linear" brand that is used to market the combined power management portfolios of Linear Technology and Analog Devices.

== Products ==
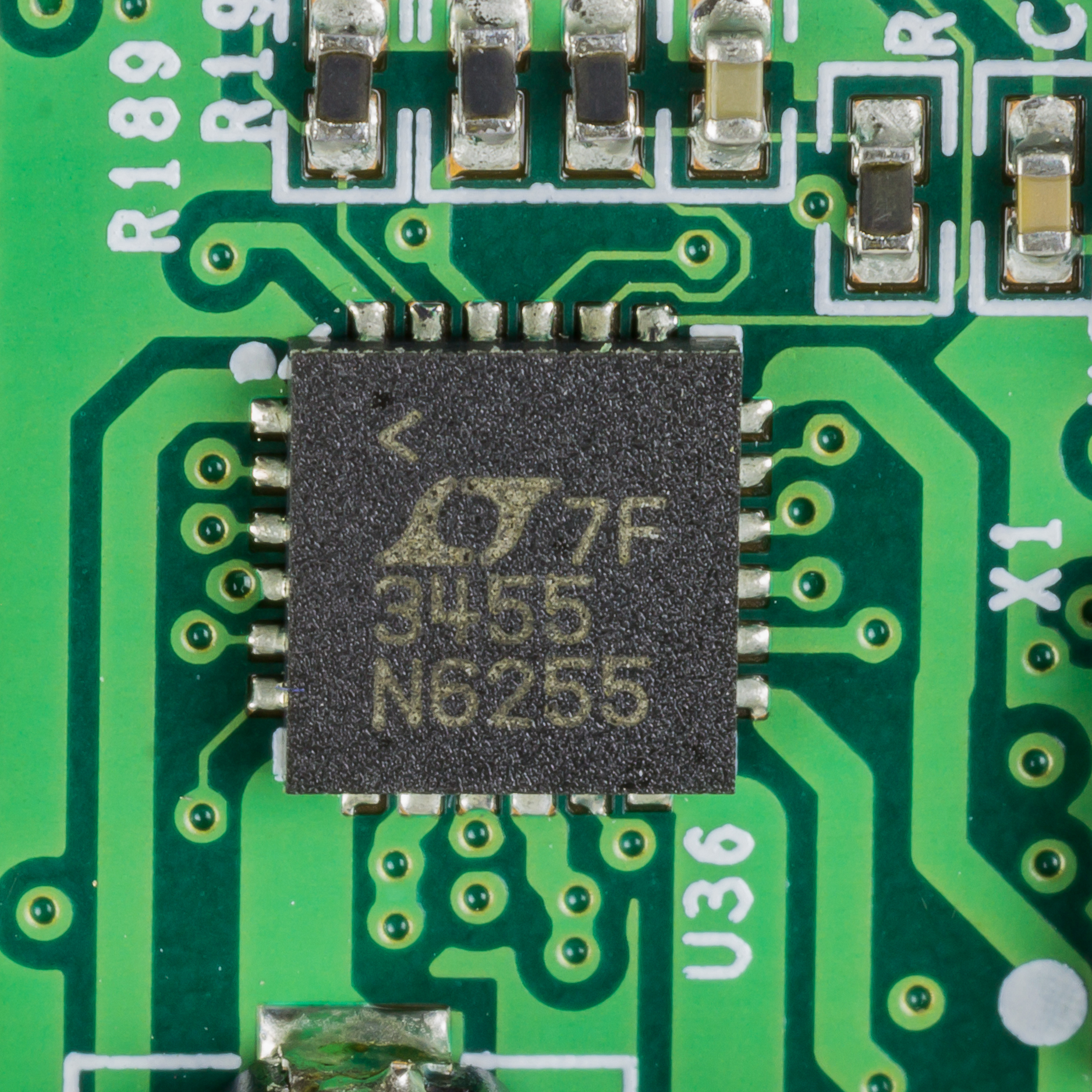
LTC3455 - Dual DC/DC Converter

As of August 2010, the company made over 7500 products, which it organized into seven product categories: data conversion (analog to digital converters, digital to analog converters), signal conditioning (operational amplifiers, comparators, voltage references), power management (switching regulators, linear regulators, battery management, LED drivers), interface (RS232, RS485), radio frequency (mixers, quadrature modulators), oscillators, and space and military ICs.

The company maintained LTspice, a freely downloadable version of SPICE that includes schematic capture.

== Locations ==
Corporate headquarters were in Milpitas, California. In the United States, the company had design centers in Phoenix, Arizona; Grass Valley, California; Santa Barbara, California; Colorado Springs, Colorado; North Chelmsford, Massachusetts; Manchester, New Hampshire; Cary, North Carolina; Plano, Texas; and Burlington, Vermont. It also had centers in Munich and Singapore.

The company's wafer fabrication facilities were located in Camas, Washington and Milpitas, California.

== See also ==
- Jim Williams
