= Voltage regulation =

Concept in electrical engineering

In electrical engineering, particularly power engineering, voltage regulation is a measure of change in the voltage magnitude between the sending and receiving end of a component, such as a transmission or distribution line. Voltage regulation describes the ability of a system to provide near constant voltage over a wide range of load conditions. The term may refer to a passive property that results in more or less voltage drop under various load conditions, or to the active intervention with devices for the specific purpose of adjusting voltage.

== Electrical power systems ==
In electrical power systems, voltage regulation is a dimensionless quantity defined at the receiving end of a transmission line as:

$\text{Percent } VR = \frac{|V_{nl}| - |V_{fl}|}{|V_{fl}|} \times 100$

where V_{nl} is voltage at no load and V_{fl} is voltage at full load. The percent voltage regulation of an ideal transmission line, as defined by a transmission line with zero resistance and reactance, would equal zero due to V_{nl} equaling V_{fl} as a result of there being no voltage drop along the line. This is why a smaller value of Voltage Regulation is usually beneficial, indicating that the line is closer to ideal.

The Voltage Regulation formula could be visualized with the following: "Consider power being delivered to a load such that the voltage at the load is the load's rated voltage V_{Rated}, if then the load disappears, the voltage at the point of the load will rise to V_{nl}."

Voltage regulation in transmission lines occurs due to the impedance of the line between its sending and receiving ends. Transmission lines intrinsically have some amount of resistance, inductance, and capacitance that all change the voltage continuously along the line. Both the magnitude and phase angle of voltage change along a real transmission line. The effects of line impedance can be modeled with simplified circuits such as the short line approximation (least accurate), the medium line approximation (more accurate), and the long line approximation (most accurate).

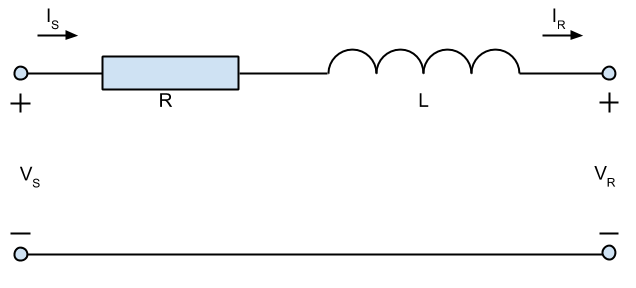
Short line approximation. Here the line impedance Z = R + jωL.

The short line approximation ignores capacitance of the transmission line and models the resistance and reactance of the transmission line as a simple series resistor and inductor. This combination has impedance R + jωL or R + jX. There is a single line current I = I_{S} = I_{R} in the short line approximation, different from the medium and long line. The medium length line approximation takes into account the shunt admittance, usually pure capacitance, by distributing half the admittance at the sending and receiving end of the line. This configuration is often referred to as a nominal - π. The long line approximation takes these lumped impedance and admittance values and distributes them uniformly along the length of the line. The long line approximation therefore requires the solving of differential equations and results in the highest degree of accuracy.

In the voltage regulation formula, V_{no load} is the voltage measured at the receiving end terminals when the receiving end is an open circuit. The entire short line model is an open circuit in this condition, and no current flows in an open circuit, so I = 0 A and the voltage drop across the line given by Ohm’s law V_{line drop} = IZ_{line} is 0 V. The sending and receiving end voltages are thus the same. This value is what the voltage at the receiving end would be if the transmission line had no impedance. The voltage would not be changed at all by the line, which is an ideal scenario in power transmission.

V_{full load} is the voltage across the load at the receiving end when the load is connected and current flows in the transmission line. Now V_{line drop} = IZ_{line} is nonzero, so the voltages and the sending and receiving ends of the transmission line are not equal. The current I can be found by solving Ohm’s law using a combined line and load impedance: $I = \frac{V_{S}}{Z_{line} + Z_{load}}$. Then the V_{R, full load} is given by $V_{S} - \frac{V_{S}Z_{line}}{Z_{line} + Z_{load}}$.

The effects of this modulation on voltage magnitude and phase angle is illustrated using phasor diagrams that map V_{R}, V_{S}, and the resistive and inductive components of V_{line drop}. Three power factor scenarios are shown, where (a) the line serves an inductive load so the current lags receiving end voltage, (b) the line serves a completely real load so the current and receiving end voltage are in phase, and (c) the line serves a capacitive load so the current leads receiving end voltage. In all cases the line resistance R causes a voltage drop that is in phase with current, and the reactance of the line X causes a voltage drop that leads current by 90 degrees. These successive voltage drops are summed to the receiving end voltage, tracing backward from V_{R} to V_{S} in the short line approximation circuit. The vector sum of V_{R} and the voltage drops equals V_{S}, and it is apparent in the diagrams that V_{S} does not equal V_{R} in magnitude or phase angle.

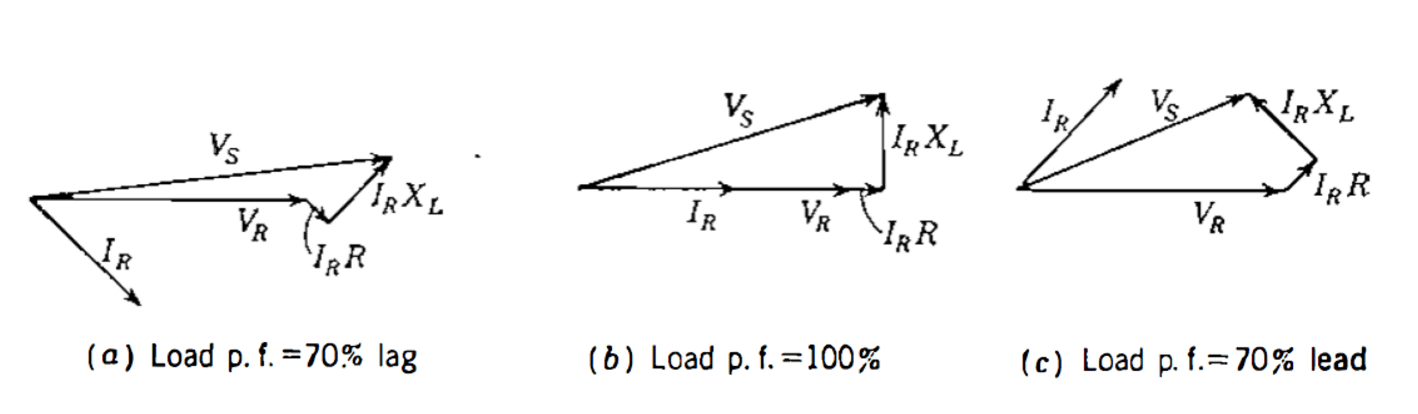
Voltage phasor diagrams for a short transmission line serving lagging, in-phase, and leading loads.

The diagrams show that the phase angle of current in the line affects voltage regulation significantly. Lagging current in (a) makes the required magnitude of sending end voltage quite large relative to the receiving end. The phase angle difference between sending and receiving end is minimized, however. Leading current in (c) actually allows the sending end voltage magnitude be smaller than the receiving end magnitude, so the voltage counterintuitively increases along the line. In-phase current in (b) does little to affect the magnitude of voltage between sending and receiving ends, but the phase angle shifts considerably.

Real transmission lines typically serve inductive loads, which are the motors that exist everywhere in modern electronics and machines. Transferring a large amount of reactive power Q to inductive loads makes the line current lag voltage, and the voltage regulation is characterized by decrease in voltage magnitude. In transferring a large amount of real power P to real loads, current is mostly in phase with voltage. The voltage regulation in this scenario is characterized by a decrease in phase angle rather than magnitude.

Sometimes, the term voltage regulation is used to describe processes by which the quantity VR is reduced, especially concerning special circuits and devices for this purpose (see below).

== Electronic power supply parameters ==
The quality of a system's voltage regulation is described by three main parameters:

Parameter	Symbol	Description
Line regulation	S_{v}	Measure of the ability to maintain a constant output voltage, regardless of changes to the input voltage
Load regulation	R_{o}	Measure of the ability to maintain a constant output voltage, regardless of the size of the system's load
Temperature dependence	S_{T}	Measure of the ability to maintain a constant output voltage, regardless of variations in temperature of electrical components within the system, especially semiconductor based devices.

== Distribution feeder regulation ==
Electric utilities aim to provide service to customers at a specific voltage level, for example, 220 V or 240 V. However, due to Kirchhoff's Laws, the voltage magnitude and thus the service voltage to customers will in fact vary along the length of a conductor such as a distribution feeder (see Electric power distribution). Depending on law and local practice, actual service voltage within a tolerance band such as ±5% or ±10% may be considered acceptable. In order to maintain voltage within tolerance under changing load conditions, various types of devices are traditionally employed:

- a load tap changer (LTC) at the substation transformer, which changes the turns ratio in response to load current and thereby adjusts the voltage supplied at the sending end of the feeder;
- voltage regulators, which are essentially transformers with tap changers to adjust the voltage along the feeder, so as to compensate for the voltage drop over distance; and
- capacitors, which reduce the voltage drop along the feeder by reducing current flow to loads consuming reactive power.

A new generation of devices for voltage regulation based on solid-state technology are in the early commercialization stages.

Distribution regulation involves a "regulation point": the point at which the equipment tries to maintain constant voltage. Customers further than this point observe an expected effect: higher voltage at light load, and lower voltage at high load. Customers closer than this point experience the opposite effect: higher voltage at high load, and lower voltage at light load.

== Complications due to distributed generation ==
Distributed generation, in particular photovoltaics connected at the distribution level, presents a number of significant challenges for voltage regulation.

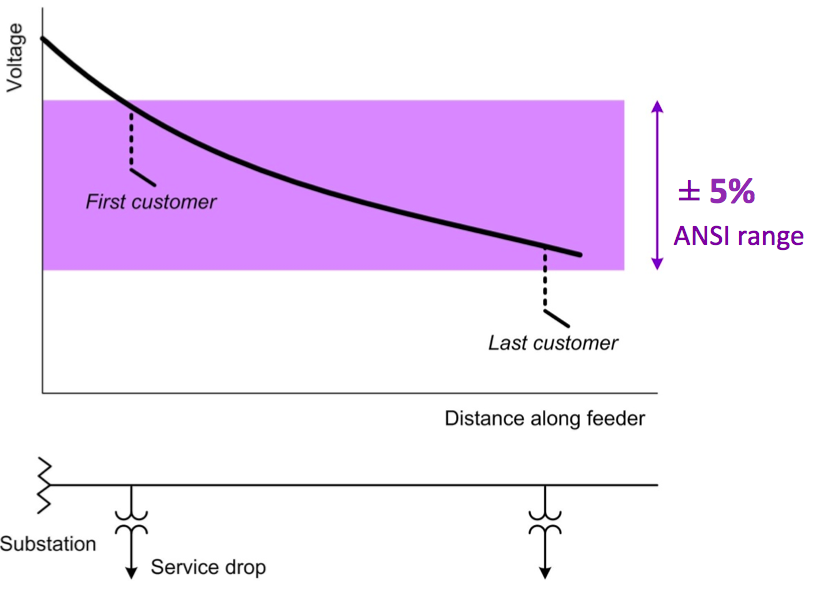
Typical voltage profile expected on a distribution feeder with no DG. This voltage profile results from current through feeders with no DG decreases with distance from the substation.

Conventional voltage regulation equipment works under the assumption that line voltage changes predictably with distance along the feeder. Specifically, feeder voltage drops with increasing distance from the substation due to line impedance and the rate of voltage drop decreases farther away from the substation. However, this assumption may not hold when DG is present. For example, a long feeder with a high concentration of DG at the end will experience significant current injection at points where the voltage is normally lowest. If the load is sufficiently low, current will flow in the reverse direction (i.e. towards the substation), resulting in a voltage profile that increases with distance from the substation. This inverted voltage profile may confuse conventional controls. In one such scenario, load tap changers expecting voltage to decrease with distance from the substation may choose an operating point that in fact causes voltage down the line to exceed operating limits.

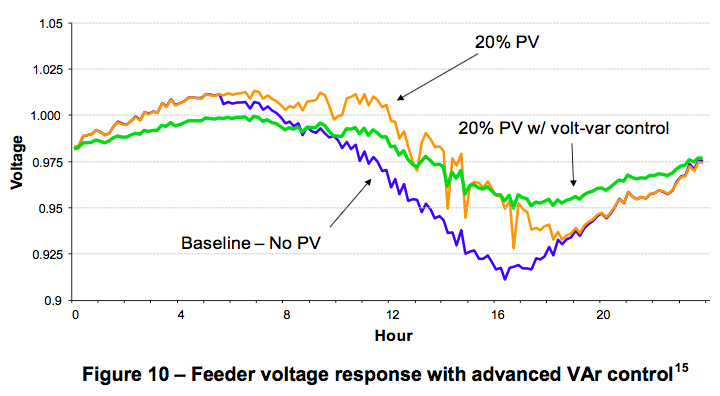
Comparison of 24-hour voltage swings on a feeder with no PV, 20% PV and 20% PV with volt-VAR control.

The voltage regulation issues caused by DG at the distribution level are complicated by lack of utility monitoring equipment along distribution feeders. The relative scarcity of information on distribution voltages and loads makes it difficult for utilities to make adjustments necessary to keep voltage levels within operating limits.

Although DG poses a number of significant challenges for distribution level voltage regulation, if combined with intelligent power electronics DG can actually serve to enhance voltage regulation efforts. One such example is PV connected to the grid through inverters with volt-VAR control. In a study conducted jointly by the National Renewable Energy Laboratory (NREL) and Electric Power Research Institute (EPRI), when volt-VAR control was added to a distribution feeder with 20% PV penetration, the diurnal voltage swings on the feeder were significantly reduced.

== Transformers ==
Real transformer equivalent circuit

One case of voltage regulation is in a transformer. The unideal components of the transformer cause a change in voltage when current flows. Under no load, when no current flows through the secondary coils, V_{nl} is given by the ideal model, where V_{S} = V_{P}*N_{S}/N_{P}. Looking at the equivalent circuit and neglecting the shunt components, as is a reasonable approximation, one can refer all resistance and reactance to the secondary side and clearly see that the secondary voltage at no load will indeed be given by the ideal model. In contrast, when the transformer delivers full load, a voltage drop occurs over the winding resistance, causing the terminal voltage across the load to be lower than anticipated. By the definition above, this leads to a nonzero voltage regulation which must be considered in use of the transformer.

== See also ==
- Voltage regulator
- Electric power distribution
- Shunt regulator
