= Regulation (disambiguation) =

Regulation is management of complex systems with fixed rules or trends.

Regulation may also refer to:

- Regulatory economics
- Regulation (European Union), Union legislation effective in member states without implementing legislation by them
- Regulation, secondary or delegated legislation, by the executive branch pursuant to leave of the legislative branch
- Regulations, class of statutory instruments
- Regulation (magazine), Cato Institute publication re moderation of government regulation
- The length of a competition in sports which is prescribed by the rules of said sport. Time beyond regulation is used in some sports or situations within sports to break ties, and is known as overtime.
- Regulation of gene expression, the biological process where genes are selectively expressed
- Control in electrical subsystems:
  - Voltage regulation, degree to which a device's output voltage remains nominal
  - Categories of voltage control:

- Line regulation, compensation for variations in supplied voltage

- Load regulation, compensation for variations in demand

== See also ==
- Regulate (disambiguation)
- Regulator (disambiguation)
