= LM317 =

Adjustable linear voltage regulator

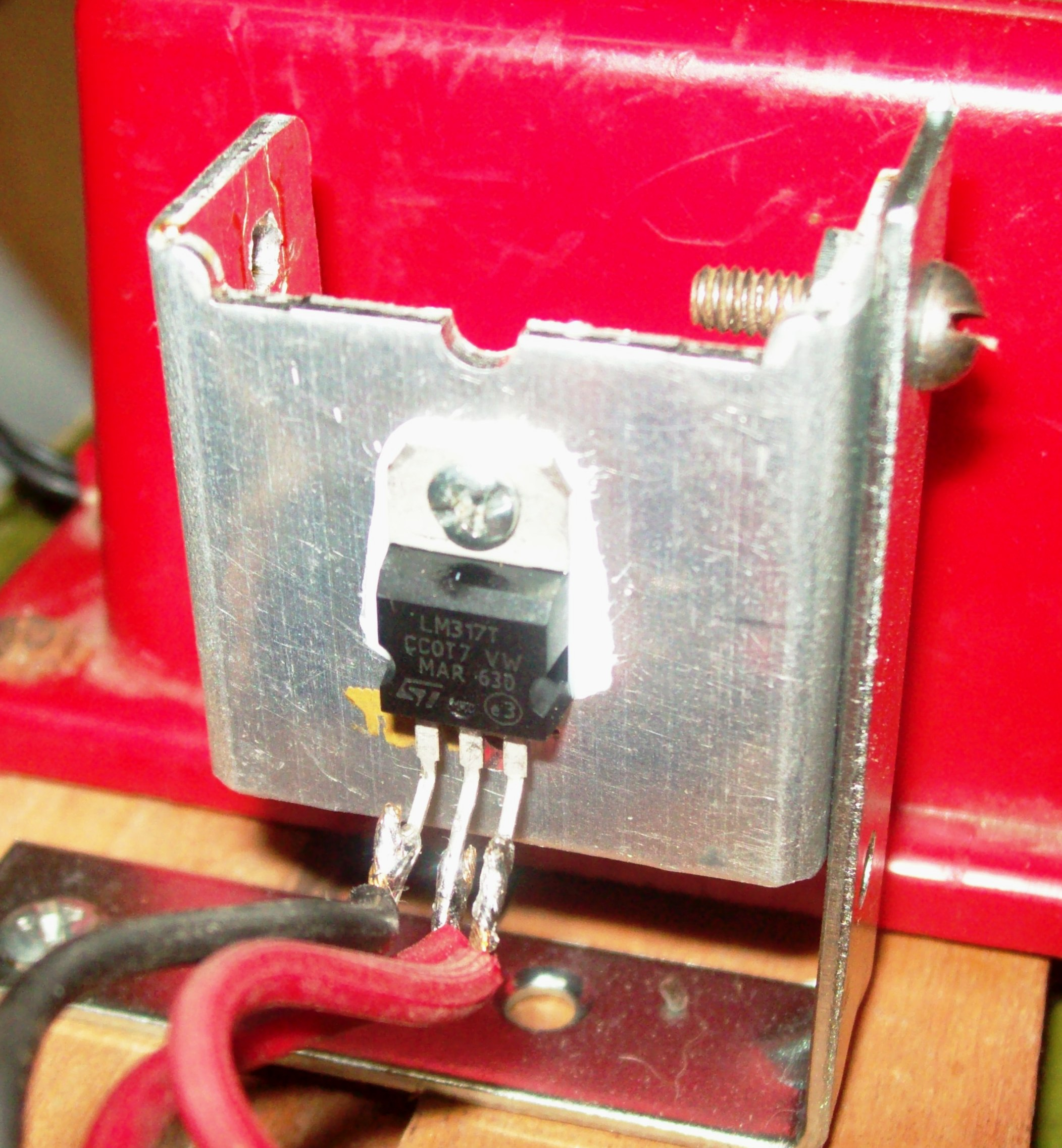
LM317 with heat sink

The LM317 is an adjustable positive linear voltage regulator. It was designed by Bob Dobkin in 1976 while he worked at National Semiconductor.

The LM337 is the negative complement to the LM317, which regulates voltages below a reference. It was designed by Bob Pease, who also worked for National Semiconductor.

== Specifications ==
LM317 pinout showing its constant voltage reference.

Symbol	Parameter	Value	Unit
V_{out}	Output voltage range	1.25–37	V
V_{in} – V_{out}	Voltage differential	3–40	V
T_{J}	Operating junction temperature range	0–125	°C
I_{O(MAX)}	Maximum output current	1.5	A
I_{L(MIN)}	Minimum load current	3.5 mA typical, 12 mA maximum	
P_{D}	Power dissipation	Internally limited	W
R_{θJA}	Thermal resistance, Junction to ambient	80	°C/W
R_{θJC}	Thermal resistance, Junction to case	5	°C/W

Without a heat sink at an ambient temperature at 50 °C, a maximum power dissipation of (T_{J} - T_{A}) / R_{θJA} = ((125-50)/80) = 0.98 W can be permitted.

In a constant voltage mode with an input voltage source at V_{IN} at 34 V and a desired output voltage of 5 V, the maximum output current will be P_{MAX} / (V_{IN}-V_{O}) = 0.98 / (34-5) = 32 mA.

For a constant current mode with an input voltage source at V_{IN} at 12 V and a forward voltage drop of V_{F}=3.6 V, the maximum output current will be P_{MAX} / (V_{IN} - V_{F}) = 0.98 / (12-3.6) = 117 mA.

== Operation ==
As linear regulators, the LM317 and LM337 are used in DC to DC converter applications.

Linear regulators inherently waste power; the power dissipated is the current passed multiplied by the voltage difference between input and output. A LM317 commonly requires a heat sink to prevent the operating temperature from rising too high. For large voltage differences, the power lost as heat can ultimately be greater than that provided to the circuit. This is the tradeoff for using linear regulators, which are a simple way to provide a stable voltage with few additional components. The alternative is to use a switching voltage regulator, which is usually more efficient, but has a larger footprint and requires a larger number of associated components.

In packages with a heat-dissipating mounting tab, such as TO-220, the tab is connected internally to the output pin which may make it necessary to electrically isolate the tab or the heat sink from other parts of the application circuit. Failure to do this may cause the circuit to short.

=== Voltage regulator ===
Schematic of LM317 in a typical voltage regulator configuration, including decoupling capacitors to address input noise and output transients.

The LM317 has three pins: INput, OUTput, and ADJustment. Internally the device has a bandgap voltage reference which produces a stable reference voltage of V_{ref}= 1.25 V followed by a feedback-stabilized amplifier with a relatively high output current capacity. How the adjustment pin is connected determines the output voltage as follows.

If the adjustment pin is connected to ground, the output pin delivers a regulated voltage of 1.25 V at currents up to the maximum. Higher regulated voltages are obtained by connecting the adjustment pin to a resistive voltage divider between the output and ground. Then

$$V_\mathrm{out} = V_\mathrm{ref} \left(1 + \frac{R_L}{R_H}\right)$$

V_{ref} is the difference in voltage between the OUT pin and the ADJ pin. V_{ref} is typically 1.25 V during normal operation.

Because some quiescent current flows from the adjustment pin of the device, an error term is added:

$$V_\mathrm{out} = V_\mathrm{ref} \left(1 + \frac{R_L}{R_H}\right) + I_Q R_L$$

To make the output more stable, the device is designed to keep the quiescent current at or below 100 μA, making it possible to ignore the error term in nearly all practical cases.

=== Current regulator ===
A constant current source circuit constructed with LM317

The device can be configured to regulate the current to a load, rather than the voltage, by replacing the low-side resistor of the divider with the load itself. The output current is that resulting from dropping the reference voltage across the resistor. Ideally, this is:

$$I_\mathrm{out} = \frac{V_\mathrm{ref}}{R_H}$$

Accounting for quiescent current, this becomes:

$$I_\mathrm{out} = \frac{V_\mathrm{ref}}{R_H} + I_Q$$

LM317 can also be used to design various other circuits like 0 V to 30 V regulator circuit, adjustable regulator circuit with improved ripple rejection, precision current limiter circuit, tracking pre-regulator circuit, 1.25 V to 20 V regulator circuit with minimum program current, adjustable multiple on-card regulators with single control, battery charger circuit, 50 mA constant current battery charger circuit, slow turn-on 15 V regulator circuit, ac voltage regulator circuit, current-limited 6 V charger circuit, adjustable 4 V regulator circuit, high-current adjustable regulator circuit and many more.

== Compared to 78xx/79xx ==
The LM317 is an adjustable analogue to the popular 78xx fixed regulators. Like the LM317, each of the 78xx regulators is designed to adjust the output voltage until it is some fixed voltage above the adjustment pin (which in this case is labelled "ground").

The mechanism used is similar enough that a voltage divider can be used in the same way as with the LM317 and the output follows the same formula, using the regulator's fixed voltage for V_{ref} (e.g. 5 V for 7805). However, the 78xx device's quiescent current is substantially higher and less stable. Because of this, the error term in the formula cannot be ignored and the value of the low-side resistor becomes more critical. More stable adjustments can be made by providing a reference voltage that is less sensitive than a resistive divider to current fluctuations, such as a diode drop or a voltage buffer. The LM317 is designed to compensate for these fluctuations internally, making such measures unnecessary.

The LM337 relates in the same way to the fixed 79xx regulators.

== Second sources from Eastern Bloc ==
The LM317 has an East European equivalent, the B3170V, which was manufactured in the German Democratic Republic (East Germany) by HFO (part of Kombinat Mikroelektronik Erfurt). Also, in the USSR, the K142EN12A and KR142EN12A were manufactured and were very common. These ICs are functional analogues of the LM317.

== See also ==
- Bandgap voltage reference
- Brokaw bandgap reference
- List of LM-series integrated circuits
