= Regulator =

Regulator may refer to:

== Technology ==
- Regulator (automatic control), a device that maintains a designated characteristic, as in:
  - Battery regulator
  - Pressure regulator
  - Diving regulator
  - Voltage regulator
- Regulator (sewer), a control device used in a combined sewer system
- Regulator (timepiece), a device in mechanical timepieces attached to the balance spring for adjusting the rate of the balance wheel
- Regulator precision pendulum clock, originally used as a time-standard for adjusting or regulating other clocks and watches
- Regulator, the throttle of a steam engine
- Regulator, a component of Uilleann pipes, a form of bagpipes

== Science ==
- Regulator (mathematics), a positive real number used in Dirichlet's unit theorem
- Regulator (biology), an animal that is able to maintain a constant internal environment
- Regulator gene, a gene involved in controlling the expression of one or more other genes
- Regulator, an auxiliary physics concept used in regularization

== Music and literature ==
- The Regulators (novel), a novel by Stephen King writing as Richard Bachman
- "The Regulator", a song by Clutch from Blast Tyrant
- "Regulator", a song by Devin Townsend from Ocean Machine: Biomech

== Organizations ==
- Regulator, a member of the Royal Navy Police, formerly the Royal Navy Regulating Branch
- Regulator, a member of the Red Army traffic control units, mostly female
- Regulators, a faction in the Regulator Movement (1765–1771) in Provincial North Carolina
- Regulator, a member of the Shaysites, followers of Daniel Shays during Shays' Rebellion (1786)
- Regulators, a faction in the Regulator–Moderator War (1839–1844)
- Regulator, a vigilante organized in response to the Banditti of the Prairie (1835–1848)
- Lincoln County Regulators, a deputized posse during the Lincoln County War (1878)
- Regulatory agency, a governmental body which oversees a particular economic activity

== Transportation ==
- Regulator (sternwheeler), a sternwheel-driven steamboat built in 1891

== See also ==
- Regulate (disambiguation)
- Regulation (disambiguation)
