= Rules and Regulations =

Rules and Regulations may refer to:

- Rules and Regulations (album) by Roll Deep, 2007, and its title track
- "Rules and Regulations", a 1986 EP by We've Got a Fuzzbox and We're Gonna Use It
- "Rules and Regulations" (song), by Rufus Wainwright, 2007
- "Rules And Regulations", a song by Public Image Limited from the 1987 album Happy? (Public Image Ltd album)
- ”Rules and Regulations”, a Thomas & Friends song

== See also ==
- Rule (disambiguation)
- Regulation (disambiguation)
