= Regulate =

Regulate may refer to:

- Regulation
- Regulate...G Funk Era, an album from rapper Warren G
  - Regulate (song), title song from the album

== See also ==
- Regulator (disambiguation)
- Regulation (disambiguation)
