= Programmable load =

A programmable load is a type of test equipment or instrument which emulates DC or AC resistance loads normally required to perform functional tests of batteries, power supplies or solar cells. By virtue of being programmable, tests like load regulation, battery discharge curve measurement and transient tests can be fully automated and load changes for these tests can be made without introducing switching transient that might change the measurement or operation of the power source under test.

== Implementation ==
Programmable loads most commonly use one transistor/FET, or an array of parallel connected transistors/FETs for more current handling, to act as a variable resistor. Internal circuitry in the equipment monitors the actual current through the transistor/FET, compares it to a user-programmed desired current, and through an error amplifier changes the drive voltage to the transistor/FET to dynamically change its resistance. This 'negative feedback' results in the actual current always matching the programmed desired current, regardless of other changes in the supplied voltage or other variables. Of course, if the power source is not able to supply the desired amount of current, the DC load equipment cannot furnish the difference; it can restrict current to a level, but it cannot boost current to a higher level. Most commercial DC loads are equipped with microprocessor front end circuits that allow the user to not only program a desired current through the load ('constant current' or CC), but the user can alternatively program the load to have a constant resistance (CR) or constant power dissipation (CP).
