= 78xx =

Series of voltage regulator integrated circuits

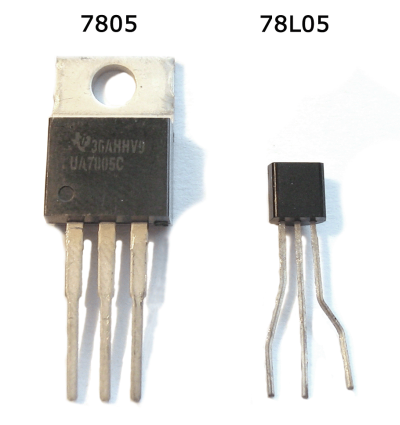
7805 in TO-220 and TO-92 packages

Schematic of 5V LM7805 linear voltage regulator with 2 decoupling capacitors

78xx (sometimes L78xx, LM78xx, MC78xx...) is a family of self-contained fixed linear voltage regulator integrated circuits. The 78xx family is commonly used in electronic circuits requiring a regulated power supply due to their ease-of-use and low cost.

== Nomenclature and packaging ==
For ICs within the 78xx family, the xx is replaced with two digits, indicating the output voltage (for example, the 7805 has a 5-volt output, while the 7812 produces 12 volts). The 78xx line are positive voltage regulators: they produce a voltage that is positive relative to a common ground. There is a related line of 79xx devices which are complementary negative voltage regulators. 78xx and 79xx ICs can be used in combination to provide positive and negative supply voltages in the same circuit.

78xx ICs have three terminals and are commonly found in the TO-220 form factor, although they are also available in TO-92, TO-3 'through hole' and SOT-23 surface-mount packages. These devices support an input voltage anywhere from around 2.5 volts over the intended output voltage up to a maximum of 35 to 40 volts depending on the model, and typically provide 1 or 1.5 amperes of current (though smaller or larger packages may have a lower or higher current rating).

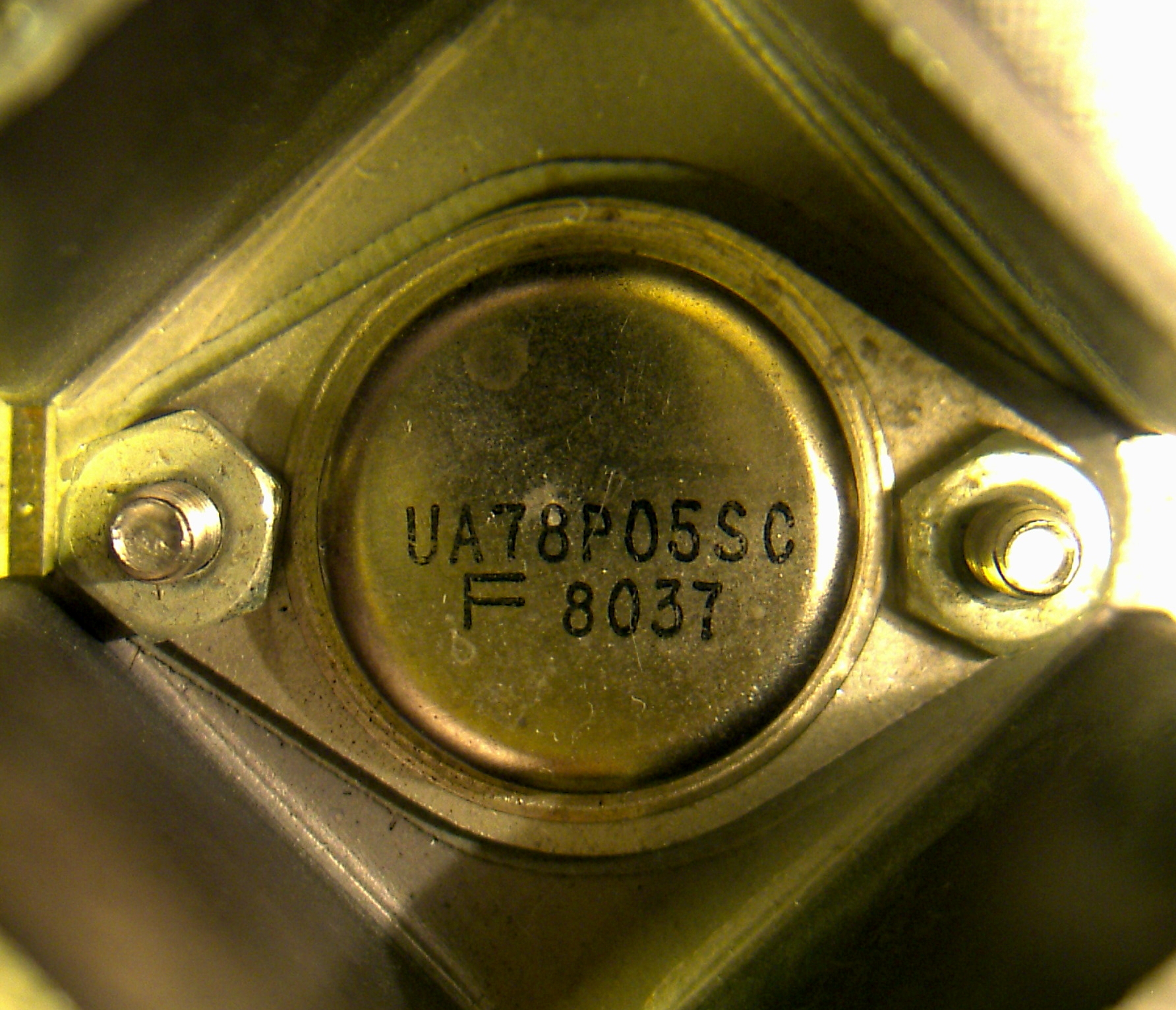
uA78P05 in a TO-3 package mounted on a heatsink

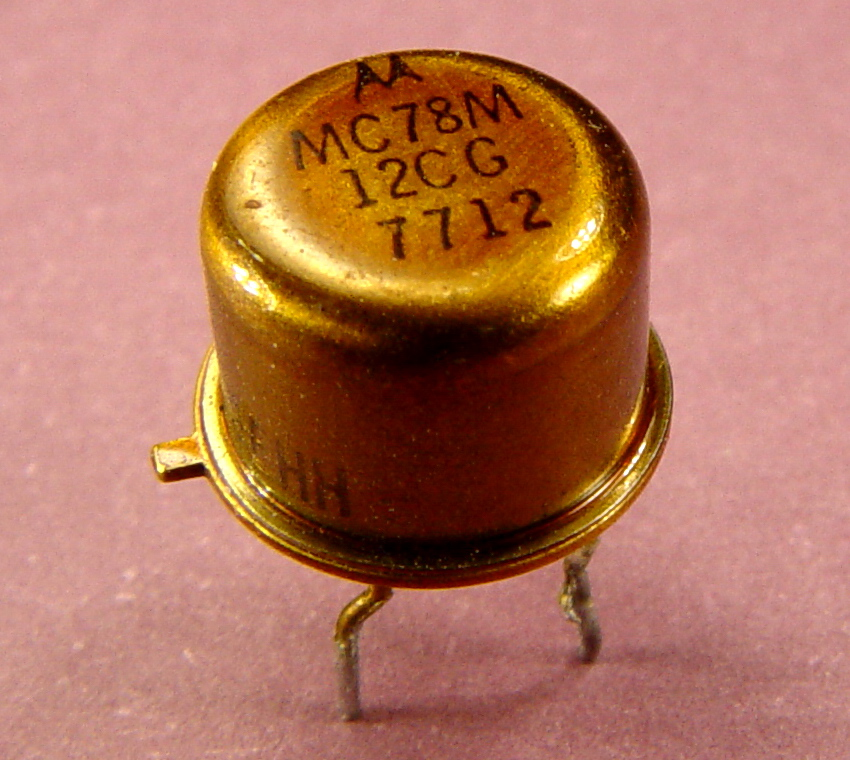
MC78M12CG in a TO-39 package

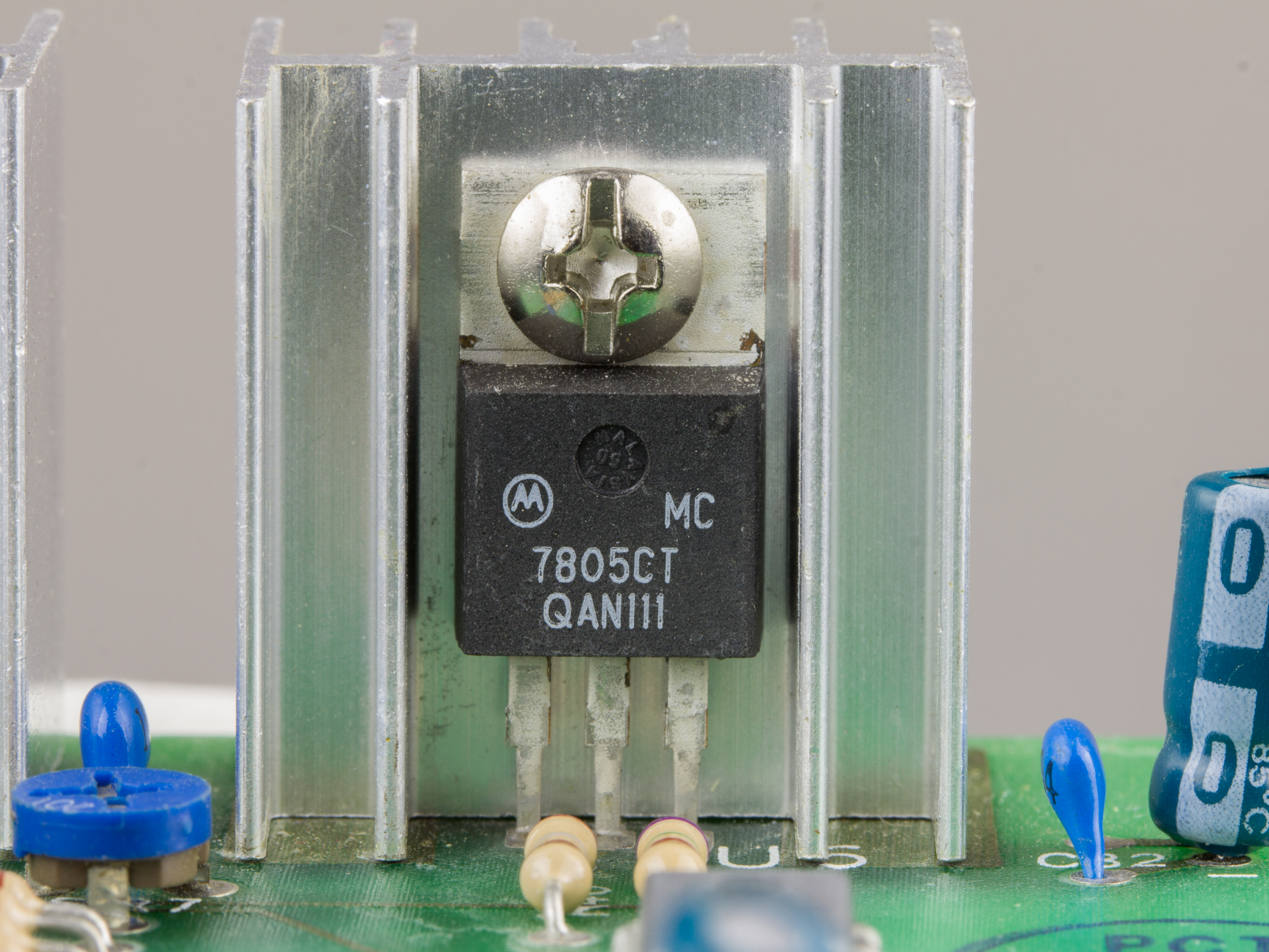
MC7805CT in a TO-220 package mounted on a heatsink

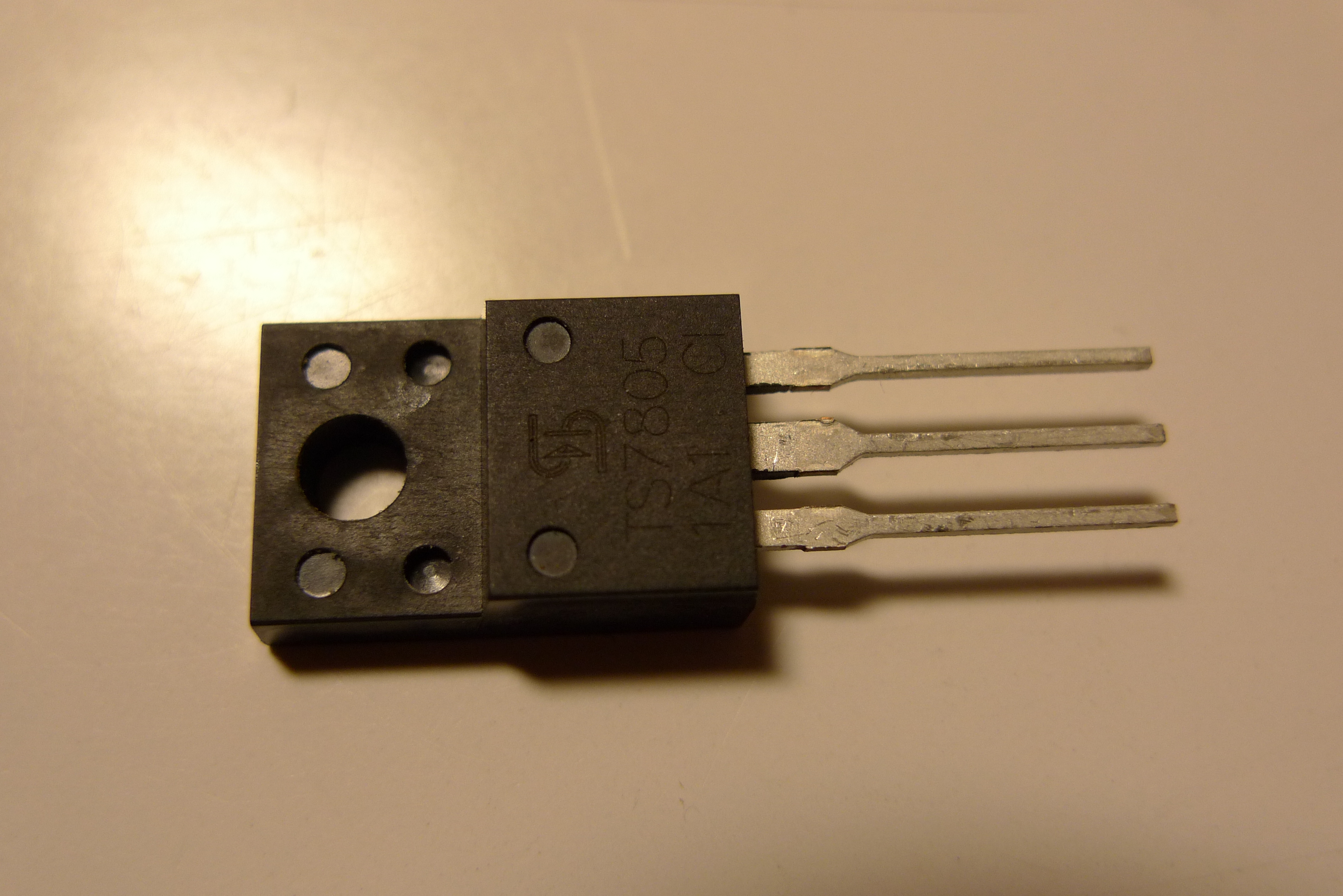
TS7805 in an electrically isolated TO-220 through-hole package

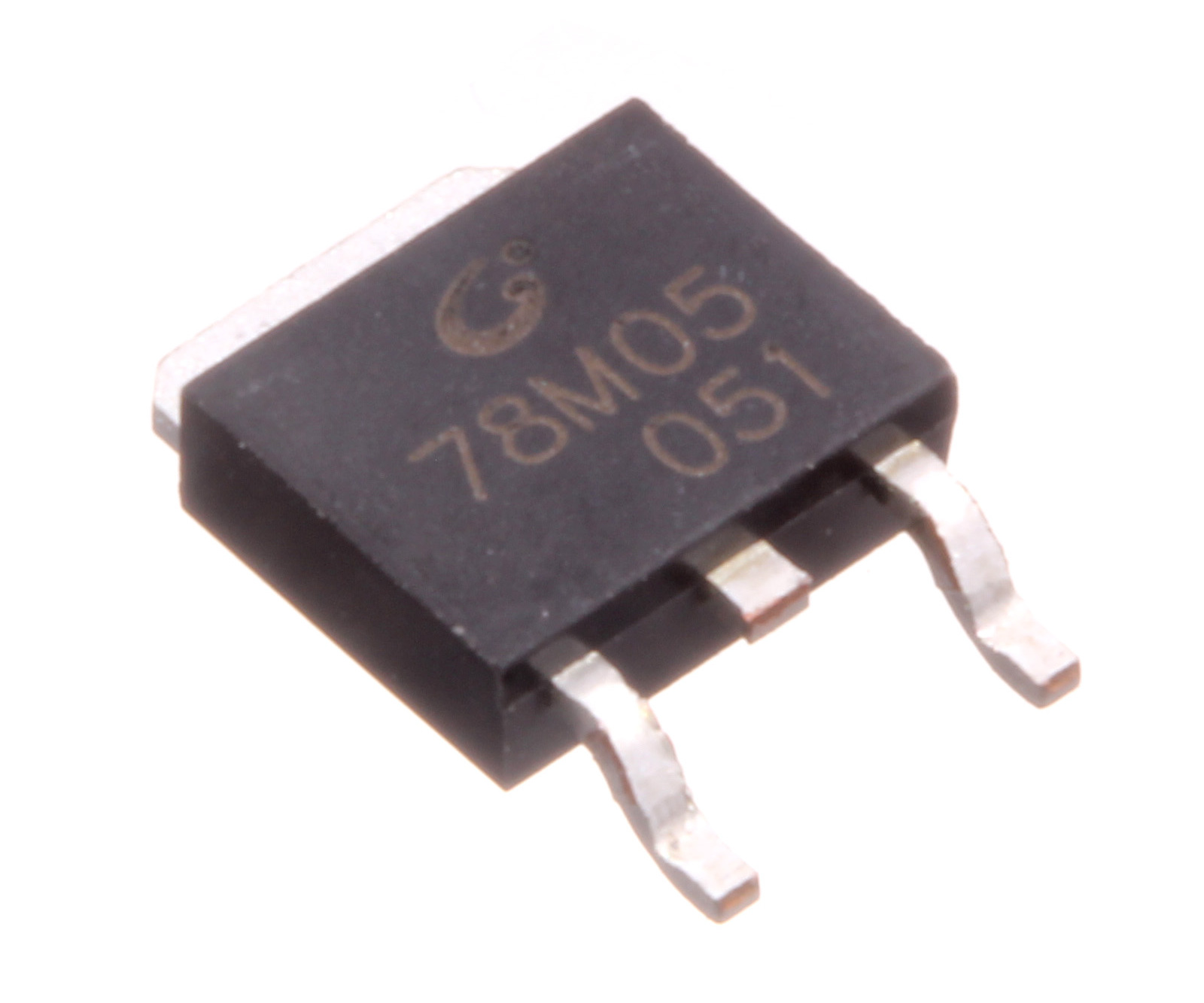
78M05 in a TO-252 (DPAK) surface-mount package

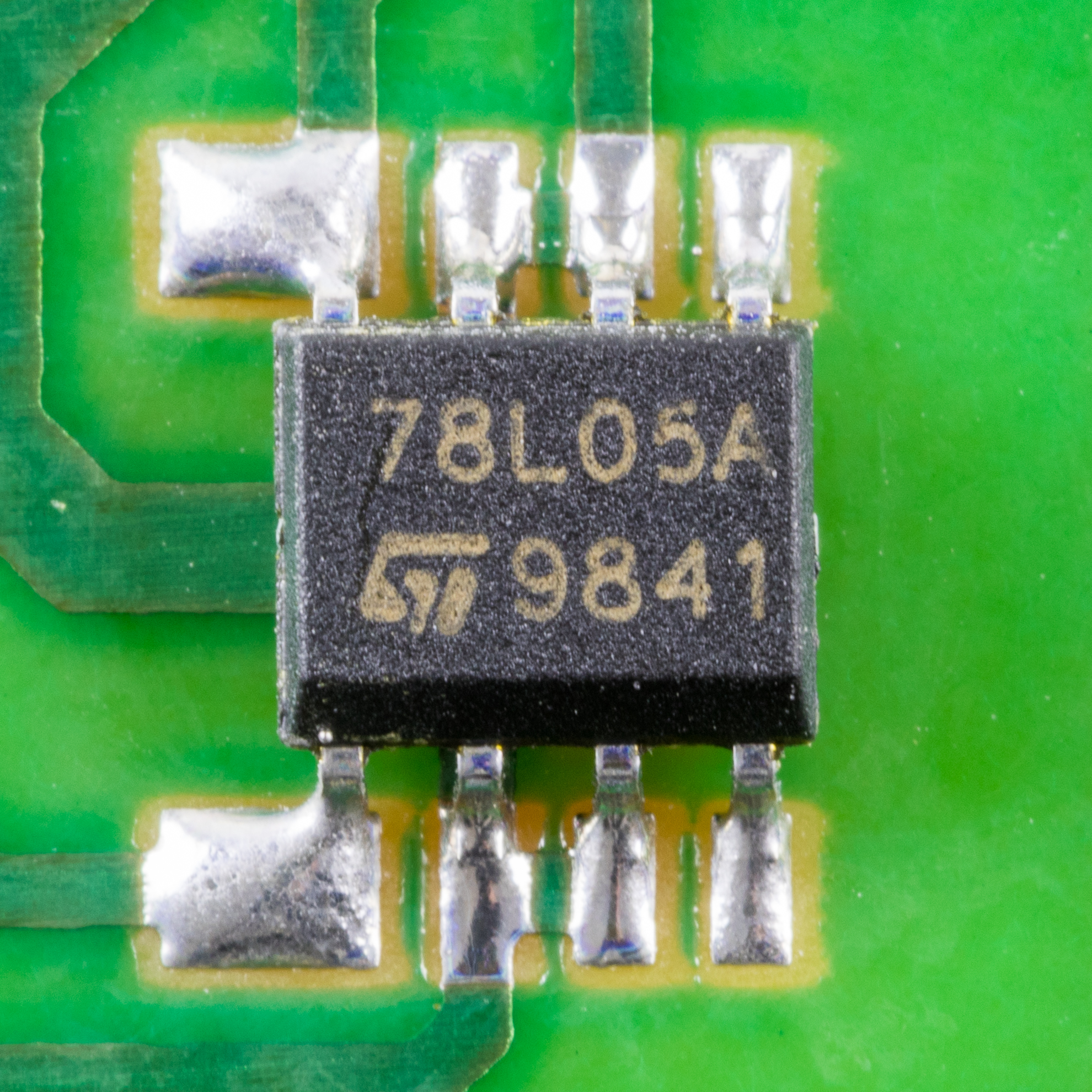
STMicroelectronics 78L05A in a SO-8 surface-mount package with larger solder pads on the left for wave soldering.

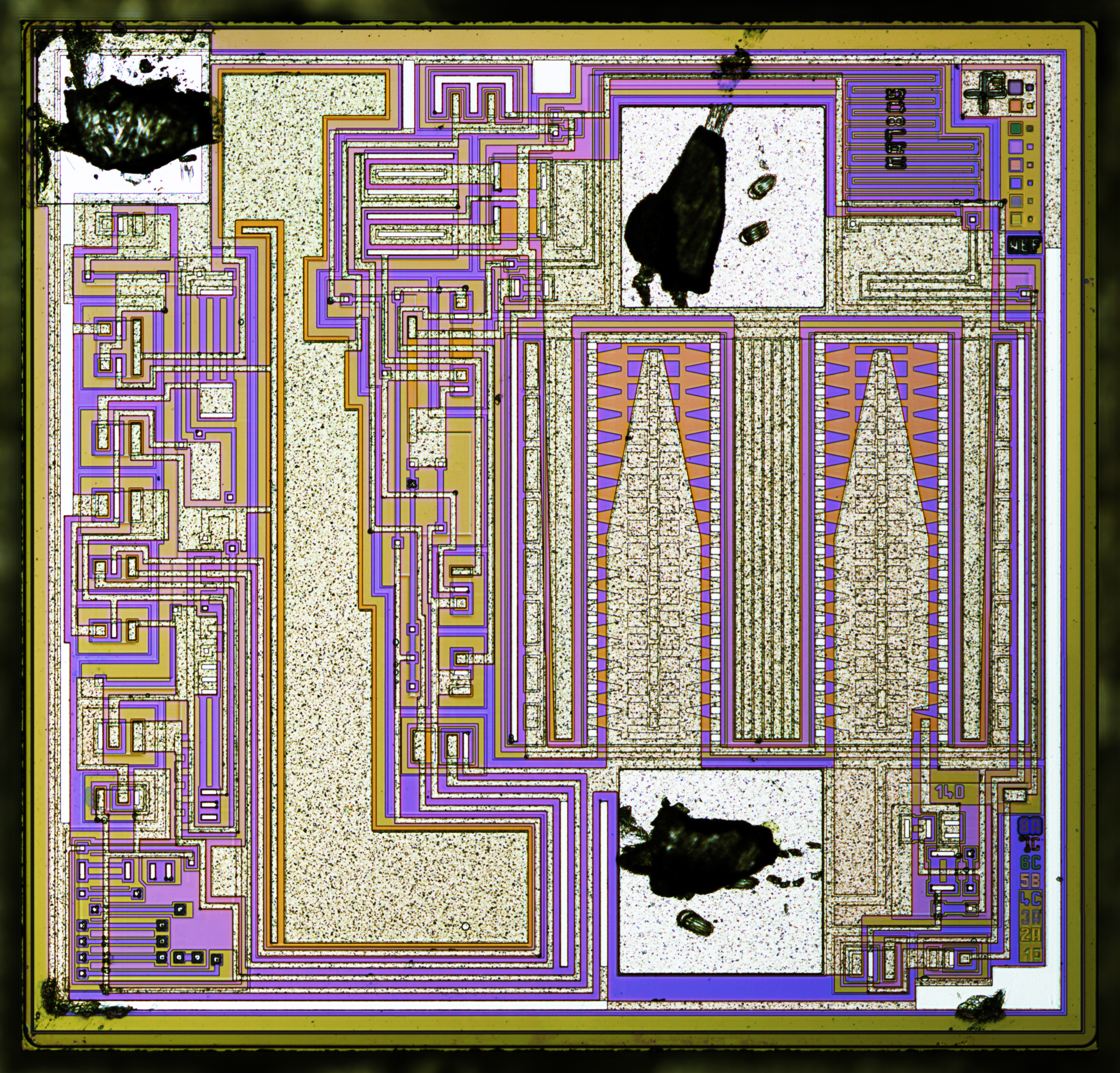
Internal die of a Tesla MA7805

== Family members ==
Typical application circuit for a simple power supply, showing transformer, bridge rectifier, 78xx regulator, and filter capacitors

=== 78xx ===
There are common configurations for 78xx ICs, including 7805 (5 V), 7806 (6 V), 7808 (8 V), 7809 (9 V), 7810 (10 V), 7812 (12 V), 7815 (15 V), 7818 (18 V), and 7824 (24 V) versions. The 7805 is the most common, as its regulated 5-volt supply provides a convenient power source for most TTL components.

Less common are lower-power versions such as the LM78Mxx series (500 mA) and LM78Lxx series (100 mA) from National Semiconductor. Some devices provide slightly different voltages than usual, such as the LM78L62 (6.2 volts) and LM78L82 (8.2 volts) as well as the STMicroelectronics L78L33ACZ (3.3 volts).

The 7805 has been used in some ATX power supply designs for the +5 V_{SB} (+5 V standby) output.

=== 79xx ===
The 79xx devices have a similar "part number" to "voltage output" scheme, but their outputs are negative voltage, for example 7905 is −5 V and 7912 is −12 V.

The 7905 and/or 7912 were popular in many older ATX power supply designs, and some newer ATX power supplies may have a 7912.

=== Unrelated devices ===
The LM78S40 from Fairchild is not part of the 78xx family and does not use the same design. It is a component in switching regulator designs and is not a linear regulator like other 78xx devices. The 7803SR from Datel is a full switching power supply module (designed as a drop-in replacement for 78xx chips), and not a linear regulator like the 78xx ICs.

== Advantages ==
- While external capacitors are typically required, 78xx series ICs do not require additional components to set their output voltage. 78xx designs are simple in comparison to switch-mode power supply designs.
- 78xx series ICs have built-in protection against a circuit drawing too much current. They have protection against overheating and short-circuits, making them robust in most applications.

== Disadvantages ==
- The input voltage must always be higher than the output voltage by some minimum amount (typically 2.5 volts). This can make these devices unsuitable for powering some devices from certain types of power sources (for example, powering a circuit that requires 5 volts using 6-volt batteries will not work using a 7805). For input voltages closer to the output voltage, a pin-compatible low-dropout regulator (LDO) can be used instead.
- As they are based on a linear regulator design, the input current required is always the same as the output current. As the input voltage must always be higher than the output voltage, this means that the total power (voltage multiplied by current) going into the 78xx will be more than the output power provided. The difference is dissipated as heat. This means both that for some applications an adequate heatsink must be provided, and also that a (often substantial) portion of the input power is wasted during the process, rendering them less efficient than some other types of power supplies. When the input voltage is significantly higher than the regulated output voltage (for example, powering a 7805 using a 24 volt power source), this inefficiency can be a significant issue. Buck converters may be preferred over 78xx regulators because they are more efficient and do not require heat sinks, though they might be more expensive.

== See also ==
- DC to DC converter – A class of devices which convert one DC voltage level to another. Linear regulators (and thus 78xx devices) are a form of DC to DC converter.
- List of linear integrated circuits
- List of LM-series integrated circuits
- LM317 – A similar linear regulator chip with a configurable output voltage.
