= Capacitance multiplier =

Circuit that makes capacitor act like a larger capacitor

A capacitance multiplier is designed to make a capacitor function like a much larger capacitor. This can be achieved in at least two ways.

- An active circuit, using a device such as a transistor or operational amplifier
- A passive circuit, using autotransformers. These are typically used for calibration standards. The General Radio / IET labs 1417 is one such example.

Capacitor multipliers make low-frequency filters and long-duration timing circuits possible that would be impractical with actual capacitors. Another application is in DC power supplies where very low ripple voltage (under load) is of paramount importance, such as in class-A amplifiers.

== Transistor-based ==
A basic transistor capacitance multiplier.

Here the capacitance of capacitor $C_1$ is multiplied by approximately the transistor's current gain (β).

Without Q, $R_2$ would be the load on the capacitor. With Q in place, the loading imposed upon $C_1$ is simply the load current reduced by a factor of $\left( \beta + 1 \right)$. Consequently, $C_1$ appears multiplied by a factor of $\left( \beta + 1 \right)$when viewed by the load.

Another way is to look at this circuit as an emitter follower with capacitor C1 holding voltage at base constant with load of input impedance of Q1:

$Z_{\text{in}} = R_2 \cdot \left( \beta +1 \right)$,

so the output current is stabilized much more against power line voltage noise.

== Operational amplifier based ==
A basic op amp capacitance multiplier.

Here, the capacitance of capacitor C1 is multiplied by the ratio of resistances:

$C = C_1 \cdot \frac{R_1}{R_2}$

at the $V_i$ node.

More advanced capacitance multiplier

The synthesized capacitance also brings a series resistance approximately equal to $R_2$, and a leakage current appears across the capacitance because of the input offsets of OP. These problems can be avoided by a circuit with two op amps. In this circuit the input to OP1 can be a.c.-coupled if necessary, and the capacitance can be made variable by making the ratio of $R_1$ to $R_2$ variable.

$C = C_1 \cdot \left(1 + \frac{R_2}{R_1}\right)$

In the circuits described above the capacitance is grounded, but floating capacitance multipliers are possible.

A negative capacitance multiplier can be created with a negative impedance converter.

== Autotransformer based ==
These permit the synthesis of accurate values of large capacitance (e.g., 1 F) by multiplying the capacitance of a high-precision lower value capacitor by the use of two transformers. Its function acts as a reference standard, not as a general-purpose circuit element. The resulting device is a four-terminal element and cannot be used at dc.
