= Line regulation =

Line regulation is the ability of a power supply to maintain a constant output voltage despite changes to the input voltage, with the output current drawn from the power supply remaining constant.

$$\text{Line Regulation} = \frac{\Delta V_\text{o}}{\Delta V_\text{i }} \cdot 100\%$$

where ΔVi is the change in input voltage while ΔVo is the corresponding change in output voltage.

It is desirable for a power supply to maintain a stable output regardless of changes in the input voltage. The line regulation is important when the input voltage source is unstable or unregulated and this would result in significant variations in the output voltage. The line regulation for an unregulated power supply is usually very high for a majority of operations, but this can be improved by using a voltage regulator. A low line regulation is always preferred. In practice, a well regulated power supply should have a line regulation of at most 0.1%.

In the regulator device datasheets the line regulation is expressed as percent change in output with respect to change in input per volt of the output. Mathematically it is expressed as:

$$\text{Line Regulation} = \frac{\Delta V_\text{o}}{\Delta V_\text{i } \cdot V_\text{o}} \cdot 100\%/V$$

The unit here is %/V. For example, In the ABLIC Inc. S1206-series regulator device the typical line regulation is expressed as 0.05%/V which means that the change in the output with respect to change in the input of the regulator device is 0.05%, when the output of the device is set at 1V. Moreover, the line regulation of the device expressed in the datasheet is temperature dependent. Usually the datasheets mention line regulation at 25 °C.

== See also ==
- Load regulation
- Linear regulator
