= CMoy =

Portable headphone amplifier

Common CMoy in Altoids tin

CMoy in parts

A CMoy is a pocket headphone amplifier originally designed by Pow Chu Moy.

The headphone amplifier is designed around single or dual-channel operational amplifiers (op-amps) such as Burr-Brown's OPA2134 or OPA2132PA, however, a wide variety of op-amps have been successfully implemented. As the op-amp directly drives headphones, some care should be given when choosing an op-amp. Some op-amps are not suitable for such low impedance loads and will result in poor performance. (See Op-amp swapping.)

The amplifier's design is quite simple. It consists of only a few components, can be assembled on a small section of protoboard, has a lower parts cost than other headphone amplifiers, and can run for many hours on a single 9 volt battery.

== Circuit ==
A typical CMoy consists of two identical AC coupled, non-inverting operational amplifier circuits each with a 100kΩ input impedance.

Power is supplied to the opamps using a dual power supply, which effectively divides the input voltage source in half to create a virtual ground. Many virtual ground circuit options are presented in the various CMoy tutorials found online.
