= Gainclone =

An example of a Gainclone

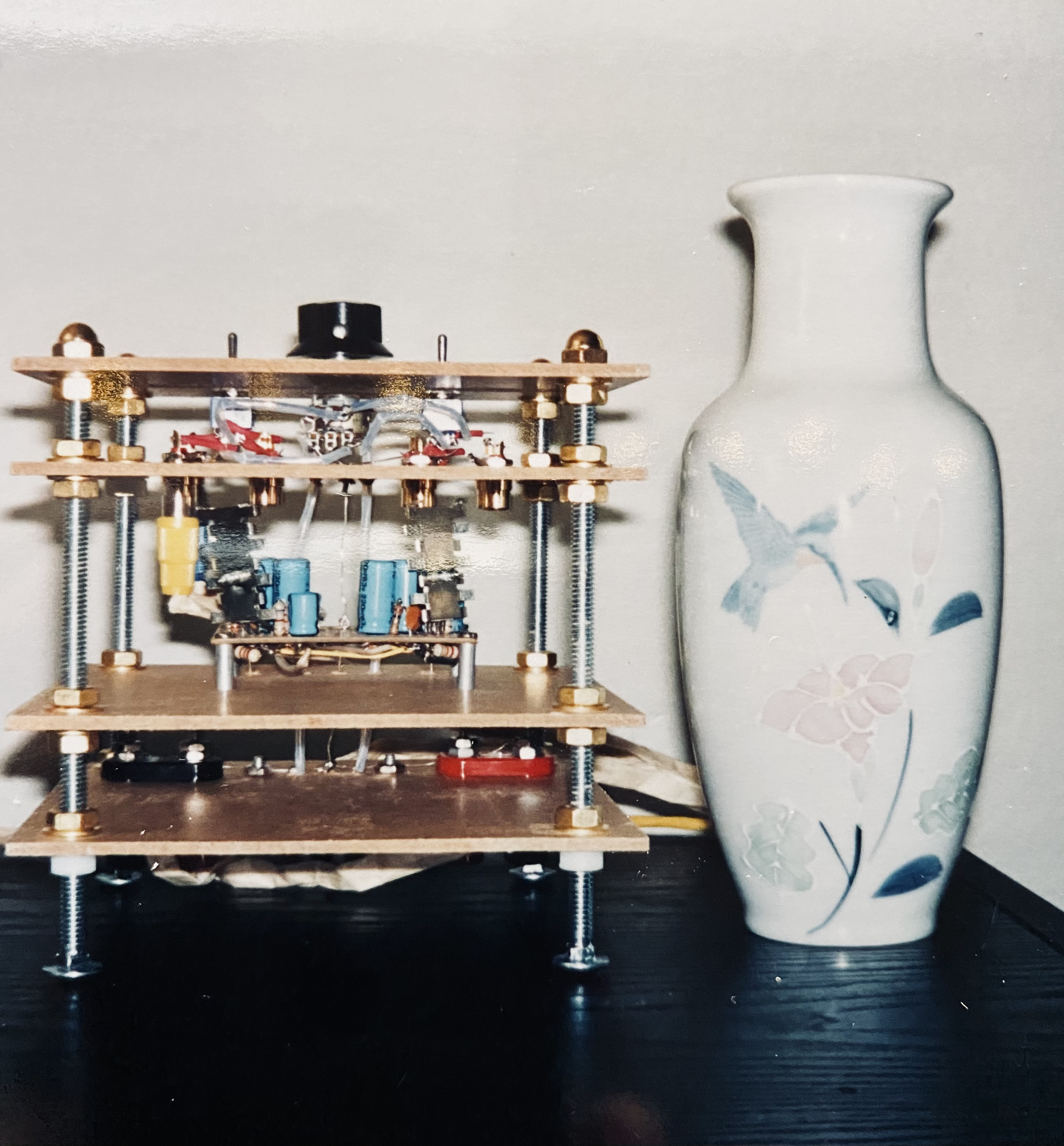
The very first Gainclone amp built by R. Salamat / Triodont (AudioAsylum) ca.1999

Gainclone or chipamp is a type of audio amplifier made by do-it-yourselfers, or individuals interested in DIY audio. It is a design based on high-power integrated circuits, particularly the National Semiconductor Overture series. The Gainclone is probably the most commonly built and well-known amplifier project amongst hobbyists. It is simple to build and involves only a few readily accessible, inexpensive parts. As an amplifier, it is highly regarded by many in the DIY community.

== Background ==
In 1999, 47 Labs introduced the Gaincard amplifier. The Gaincard shook the audiophile community with its unconventional design. It had fewer parts, less capacitance, and simpler construction than virtually anything preceding it, and relied for amplification on a 56-watt chip, the National Semiconductor LM3875. These construction techniques went against the accepted wisdom of the time, which favored large power supplies and discrete component construction. This Gaincard was estimated to cost less than 100 USD in parts, but it sold for 3300 USD with its small power supply. Controversy ensued after a number of positive reviews.

== Modern usage ==
The DIY community started building replicas or "clones" of the Gaincard using integrated circuits from National Semiconductor and other manufacturers in an attempt to see if good sound could be obtained, thereby the term: "gainclone". The name was first coined by a poster called "triodont" (Ramon Salamat) on the popular Audio Asylum board (ca. 1999;). "Triodont" tried to replicate the 47 Labs Gaincard amplifier for his own personal use and reported about it on the internet forum. Various modifications or improvements have been made to the original application circuit found in National's design notes since. The simple circuits were easy to make, and some started offering printed circuit boards and kits to make construction even easier.

The design concept has expanded and become rapidly more popular over the last few years as the simplicity of the design and availability of parts make it within reach of even a novice constructor. Now, the term "Gainclone" could apply to almost any amplifier based on a power integrated circuit of some type, from any manufacturer. In fact, the more common term today for such amplifiers is "chipamp" rather than "Gainclone", as the desire to copy the Gaincard has given way to broader attempts at using IC amplifiers.

== Typical characteristics ==
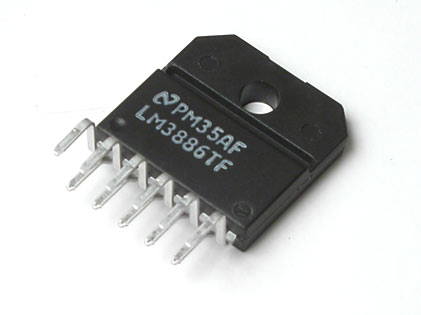
The fully insulated TF model LM3886

- A power opamp or audio opamp chip such as the National Semiconductor LM1875, LM3875, LM3886, or LM4780, which is a dual LM3886.
- A physically very short feedback loop.
- Miniaturised construction with short path lengths throughout the circuit.
- Minimal extra components, usually of high quality.
- Can be made using point-to-point construction rather than a PCB.
- The power supply is often built in a separate chassis from the amplifier.

The National Semiconductor chips come in two versions. The "T" model is not insulated and has better heat transfer properties, but it needs insulation when mounted on a heatsink if the heatsink is connected to ground. The "TF" model, as in the picture, is covered in plastic, and thus insulated, but it has less efficient heat transfer properties, which means it can't run continuously at full power. The "T" model is recommended for heavy-duty applications.

== Sound ==
Most designs produce high-quality sound, even though some audiophiles consider chip-based amplifiers to be inferior to their discrete counterparts. The chips have been designed to incorporate a number of desirable features, including excellent power supply rejection ratio, fast response, accurate bias current, over-temperature protection, and short circuit protection.
