= Schiit Audio =

Californian audio equipment manufacturer

- Type: Privately held company
- Industry: Audio electronics
- Founded: June 2010
- Founder: Jason Stoddard
- Headquarters: California, United States
- Area served: Worldwide
- Key people: Jason Stoddard & Mike Moffat
- Products: Audio equipment
- Website: www.schiit.com

Schiit Audio (commonly referred to as Schiit) is an American privately held audio company founded in June 2010 that specializes in the design, development, and production of various high-fidelity audio products targeted at the audiophile market, such as standalone digital-to-analog converters (DACs), headphone amplifiers, equalizers, preamplifiers, and speaker amplifiers, as well as combination DAC and amplifier products. The company is based in California with additional manufacturing operations in Texas.

== History ==
=== 2010-2013: Founding, initial product launches ===
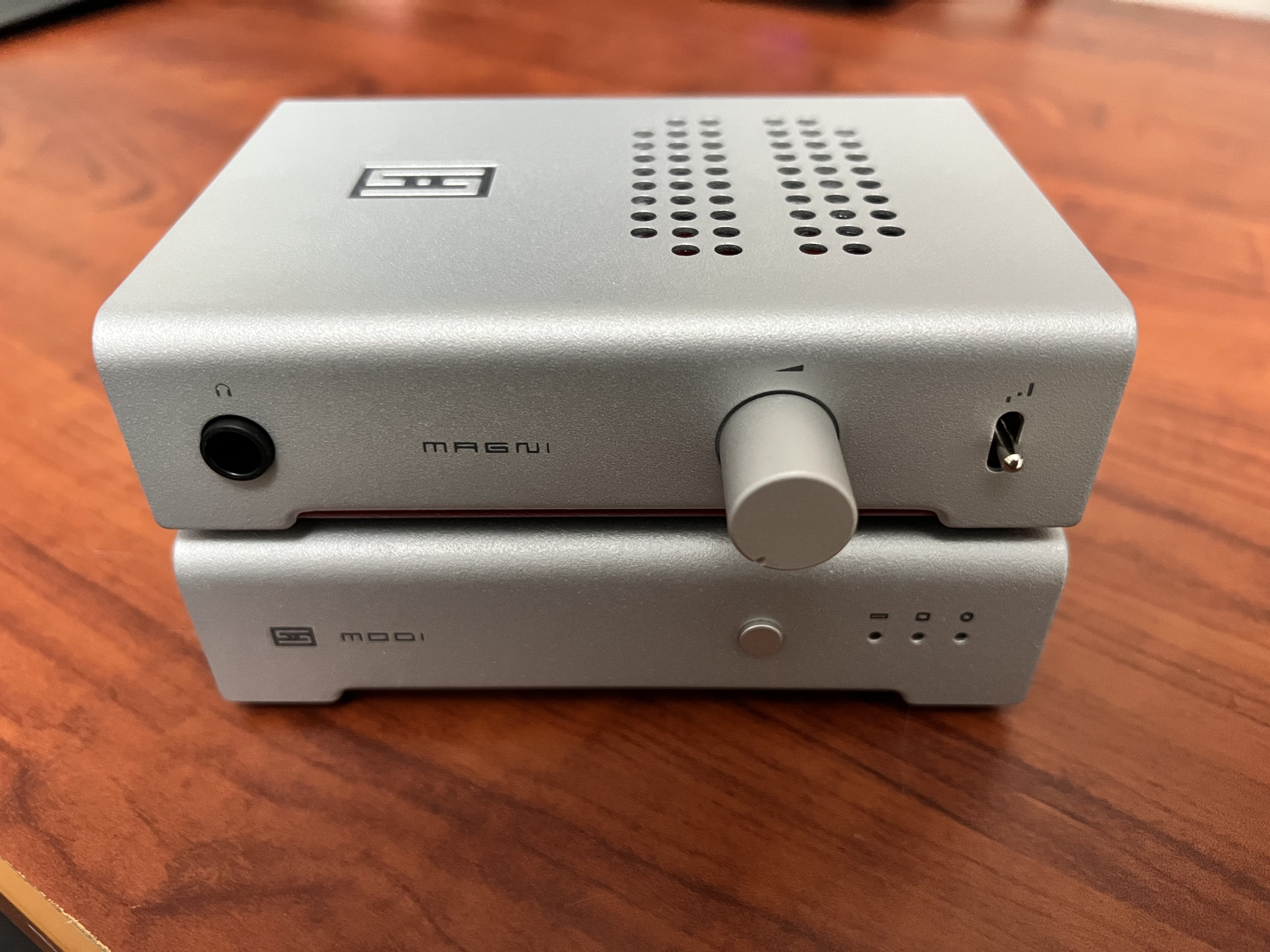
A Schiit Modi+ and Magni Heretic in Silver are stacked atop one another to form what is typically called a Schiit stack.

The company was founded in June 2010 by Jason Stoddard and Mike Moffat. The company announced its first products, the Asgard and Valhalla headphone amplifiers, on June 1, 2010, with a launch date of July 21, 2010, and August 15, 2010, respectively. Schiit later announced Lyr, a "hybrid" high-power headphone amplifier, on December 28, 2010, with expected availability in March 2011.

In June 2011, Schiit announced a user-upgradable digital to analog converter called Bifrost, a standalone DAC with the ability to purchase a model that offered support for USB input. The Bifrost was user-upgradable in that it allowed users to install optional upgrade cards that would upgrade the Bifrost's DAC or USB capabilities and would be released depending on when significant changes were made to the respective technologies.

== Products ==
=== Digital-to-analog converters ===
Schiit designs, develops and manufactures several standalone digital-to-analog converters (DACs), with the first DAC released by Schiit being the Bifrost, having been released in 2011. Several other DACs have since been released by Schiit, such as the Modi, Modius, and the Gungnir. A DAC converts a digital signal sent by a personal computer, smartphone or various other electronic devices to an analog signal that can then be decoded by a separate device typically connected via RCA cables such as a speaker amplifier or headphone amplifier in order to transmit audio to headphones, speakers, in-ear monitors, and other audio devices. Common inputs available on DACs manufactured by Schiit include S/PDIF (coaxial and TOSLINK) as well as USB.

Schiit primarily designs their DACs around digital-to-analog integrated circuits (ICs) manufactured by ESS Technology (ESS), Analog Devices, and Texas Instruments (TI), such as the ESS 9018/9028 and the TI DAC8812. Audio ICs manufactured by AKM Semiconductor, Inc. (AKM) were previously used, however in November 2020 a fire broke out at AKM's primary manufacturing facility, causing Schiit and other manufacturers of audio equipment to switch over to competing audio IC manufacturers, such as previously mentioned ESS, due to the fire destroying the facility. Schiit began the process of moving over to ESS audio ICs in August 2021, with the release of a new installable "upgrade card" that replaced the AK4490 audio IC used in their older upgrade cards with the ES9028.

==== DAC specifications ====
| Name | Colors | Inputs | D/A Conversion ICs | Bit Depth & Sample Rate | Power Supply Type |
|---|---|---|---|---|---|
| Modi+ | Black, Silver | USB, Coaxial S/PDIF, Optical S/PDIF | ESS ES9018 | 16-bit, 44.1 KHz to 24-bit, 192 KHz (Note: Can be set to a maximum of 32-bit 192KHz in Windows, Linux and macOS but the DAC will only decode up to 24-bit 192 KHz.) | USB powered (5V, USB-C) |
| Modi Multibit 2 | Black, Silver | USB, Coaxial S/PDIF, Optical S/PDIF | Analog Devices AD5547 | 16-bit, 44.1 KHz to 24-bit, 192 KHz | 14-16V AC adapter |
| Modius | Black, Silver | USB, Coaxial S/PDIF, Optical S/PDIF | ESS ES9028 | 16-bit, 44.1 KHz to 24-bit, 192 KHz | USB powered (5V, USB-C) |
| Bifrost (Note: Known on the website as the Bifrost 2/64.) | Black, Silver | USB, Coaxial S/PDIF, Optical S/PDIF | 4x TI DAC8812 | 16-bit, 44.1 KHz to 24-bit, 192 KHz | Internal power supply w/ IEC 60320 connector |
| Yggdrasil+ | Black, Silver | USB, Coaxial S/PDIF, Optical S/PDIF | Varies depending on configuration | 16-bit, 44.1 KHz to 24-bit, 192 KHz | Internal power supply w/ IEC 60320 connector |
