= Loebe Julie =

Loebe Julie (December 10, 1920 - June 7, 2015) was an American engineer who has been credited with inventing the first operational amplifier circuit with differential inputs (1943), a topology which allowed much greater versatility in applications circuits and remains in wide use today.

== Career ==
After earning a BSEE from the City College of New York in 1941, Julie worked at the Army Signal Corps in Fort Monmouth, NJ, as a civilian engineer for two years. In 1943, NDRC Division 7 contracted Columbia University's Division of War Research to improve and simplify the multi-stage vacuum tube-based amplifier circuits designed by Karl D. Swartzel Jr. for use in the Western Electric M9 gun director.

Encouraged by George A. Philbrick, who was part of the Division 7 team, Julie designed a circuit using two dual-triode vacuum tubes that not only had the novel feature of a differential input, but used fewer tubes, was much faster (100 kHz gain-bandwidth product) and more power efficient (2 × 300 V at 10 mA, plus tube heater) than the previous circuits.

After the war, Julie returned to university, earning an MS in mathematics from New York University in 1954. In 1956, he founded the company Julie Research Laboratories to produce precision resistors, calibration standards and related products. The company was acquired by Ohm-Labs in 2001.

== See also ==
- Operational amplifier
- George A. Philbrick
