= The Panderers =

American lo-fi band

- Origin: Southern Indiana, United States
- Years active: 2006 – 2014
- Label: Snack Bar
- Members: Scott Wynn (vocals, guitar, songwriter); Pete McNeal (drums, vocals, percussion); Andrew "Scrap" Livingston (upright bass and electric bass, vocals)

The Panderers were formed in late 2006 by Scott Wynn, a lo-fi, DIY audio home recorder, from rural Indiana via Cincinnati, Ohio. Blending rock, lounge soul and stark minimalism, The Panderers' sound is constructed of ultra-simplified guitar work, slurring bass lines and on-point percussion, all of which buoy Wynn's even-handed signature vocal. Wynn lists his strongest influences as lo-fi singer-songwriter as: Bill Callahan (musician), Daniel Johnston and Johnny Cash, he also has drawn direct influence from garage rockers Kings of Leon, "acid country house music" makers Alabama 3 and disco rockers Electric Six.

== Overview ==
The Panderers stemmed all from a Myspace contact from Wynn to Pete McNeal, a member of Mike Doughty's Band, an American singer-songwriter and former frontman of the band Soul Coughing through most of the 1990s before emerging as a solo artist. McNeal had also been the drummer for Cake (band) from 2001 to 2004. The two were soon contemplating an album.

McNeal shared Wynn's demo recordings with bassist and composer Andrew “Scrap” Livingston. Being both classically trained and also possessing an equally unorthodox “greasy" upright bass style, Livingston joined the album project. Incidentally, via McNeal, Wynn crossed paths with producer and Grammy nominee, Dave Wilder. Wilder and McNeal were also joint producers in a production company that they had recently formed at the time.

In late 2006, Wynn, McNeal, Livingston and Wilder all convened at Wilderstyle Studio in California, to record what would become Songs that Bang, the first full-length album as The Panderers. The LP was self-released from The Panderers' Myspace page, on April 25, 2007.In order to make it a true "limited-edition," The Panderers stopped selling the hand-numbered units when the serial number reach an even 1,000 and ended offering the serialized copies.

The Panderers were offered and took a showcase at the CMJ Music Marathon and Film Fest 2007.

In late 2007, Mike Doughty took an active interest in The Panderers. Doughty created a microlabel called "Snack Bar" in early 2008 and signed The Panderers to their first national record deal. Snack Bar released an EP consisting of five songs that were originally on Songs that Bang. The EP was entitled Hotshot's Boy which was an early pen name for Wynn and a nickname for Wynn as a youth.

Wynn's father was from the Southeastern Kentucky coal counties and Wynn would make regular treks to his father's mountain hometown as a child. Many knew Wynn's father only as "Hotshot" after an old school Wolfman Jack-esque radio DJ of the same name. Wynn was known to many in coal country simply as "Hotshot's Boy." Wynn was the first male in his family not to have been a coal miner.

The Hotshot's Boy EP was released by Snack Bar on March 12, 2008. On the very same day, Doughty brought The Panderers (Wynn, McNeal and Livingston) out on the road for their first national tour of the U.S. and parts of Canada.

== Discography ==
Songs that Bang - Self-released in 2007

Hotshot’s Boy - Snack Bar 2008

Style Rock 2 - Virgin Radio Italia 2009

Mucho Diggo - Sought Records 2009

== Television, Film and Commercials ==
LittleBigPlanet Sony PS3 game television commercial ad campaign - (Song: Come On - Snack Bar 2008)

Life (NBC TV series) on NBC, Season 2, Episode 5 - (Song: Come On - Snack Bar 2008)

Dylan Dog: Dead of Night Film soundtrack - (Song: So Hard - Mucho Diggo 2009)
