= Headphone amplifier =

Audio amplifier for headphones

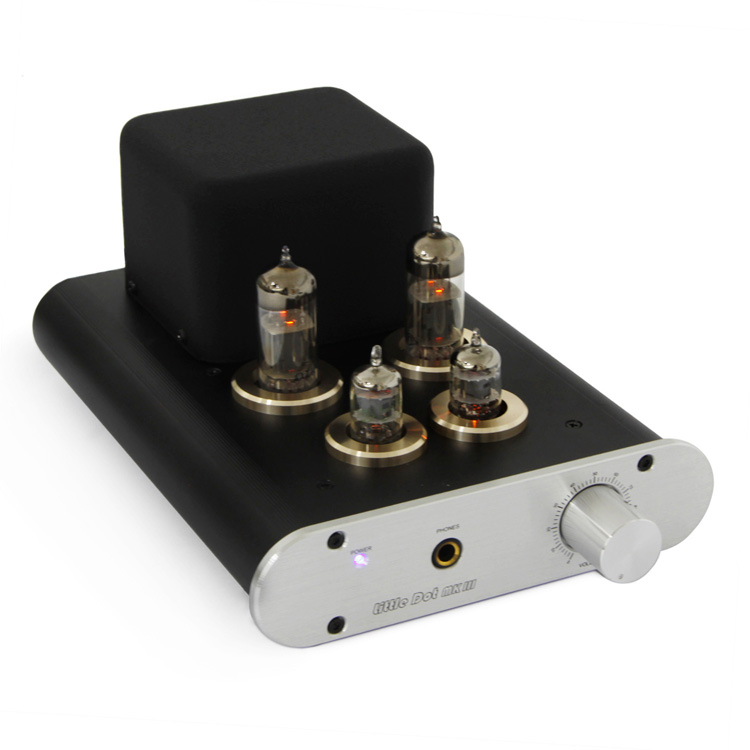
A Little Dot Mk III tube headphone amplifier.

A headphone amplifier is a low-powered audio amplifier designed particularly to drive headphones worn on or in the ears, instead of loudspeakers in speaker enclosures. Most commonly, headphone amplifiers are found embedded in electronic devices that have a headphone jack, such as integrated amplifiers, portable music players (e.g., iPods), and televisions. However, standalone units are used, especially in audiophile markets and in professional audio applications, such as music studios. Headphone amplifiers are available in consumer-grade models used by hi-fi enthusiasts and audiophiles and professional audio models, which are used in recording studios.

== Consumer models ==
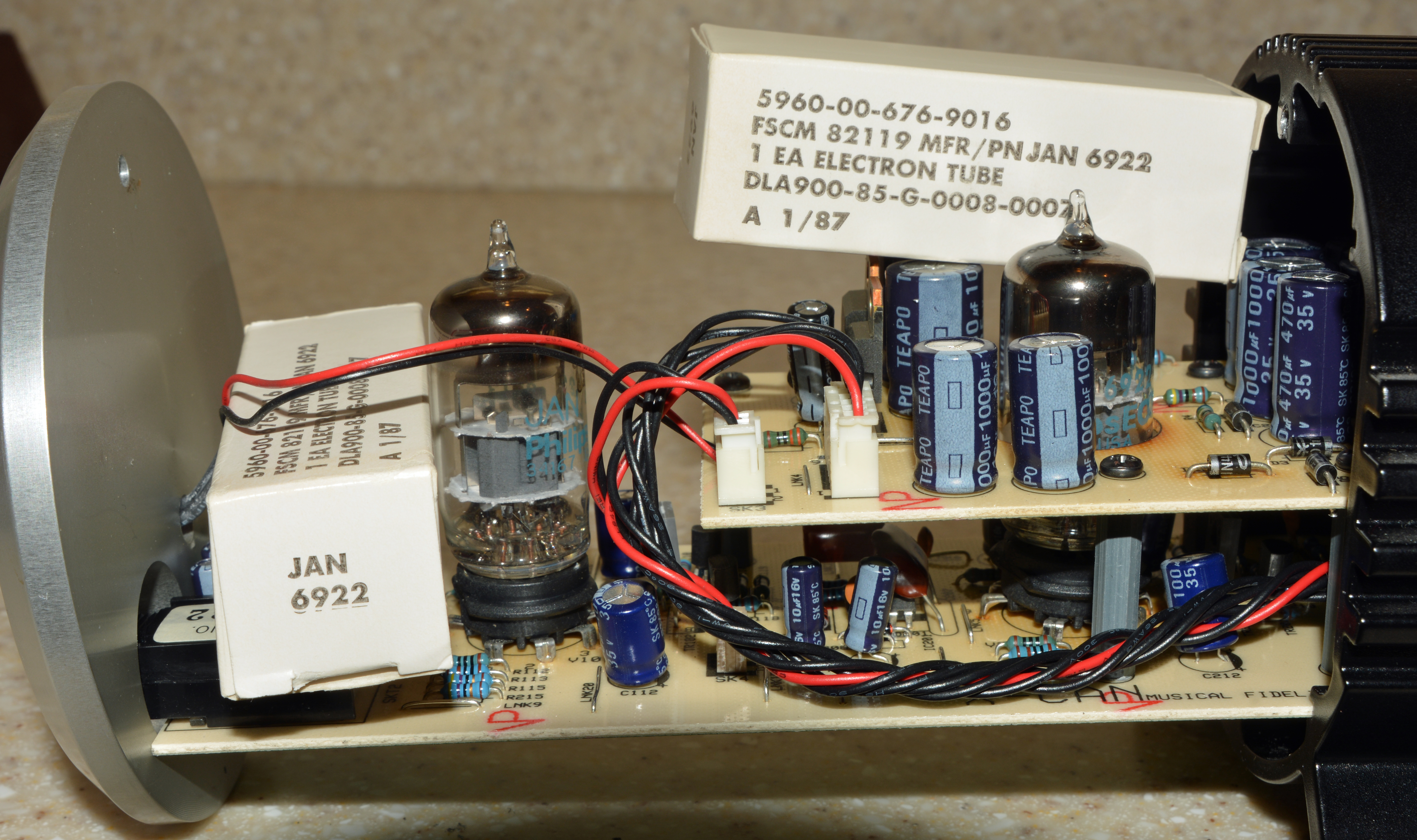
The electronics of a Musical Fidelity X-Cans, using two 6922 vacuum tubes (electronic valves)

Consumer headphone amplifiers are commercially available separate devices, sold to a niche audiophile market of hi-fi enthusiasts. Headphone amplifiers are designed to boost your headphones' sound quality and power, offering a richer and more detailed listening experience. In the case of the extremely high-end electrostatic headphones, such as the Stax SR-007, a specialized electrostatic headphone amplifier or transformer step-up box and power amplifier is required to use the headphones, as only a dedicated electrostatic headphone amplifier or transformer can provide the voltage levels necessary to drive the headphones. Most headphone amplifiers provide power between 10 mW and 2 W depending on the specific headphone being used and the design of the amplifier. Certain high-power designs can provide up to 6W of power into low impedance loads, although the benefit of such power output with headphones is unclear, as the few orthodynamic headphones that have sufficiently low sensitivities to function with such power levels will reach dangerously high volume levels with such amplifiers.

Effectively, a headphone amplifier is a small power amplifier that can be connected to a standard headphone jack or the line output of an audio source. Electrically, a headphone amplifier can be thought of as an amplifier that presents a very high input impedance (ideally infinite) and presents a lower output impedance (ideally zero) and larger range of output voltages (ideally infinite). This allows headphones of a low sensitivity to be driven louder as a result of the extra voltage provided by the amplifier. There are potential fidelity gains if headphones are driven with lower distortion than using a headphone amplifier integrated into a general-purpose audio product. In practice, this most often occurs when using low impedance headphones with consumer electronics with insufficiently low output impedance (see impedance discussion below).

=== Volume ===
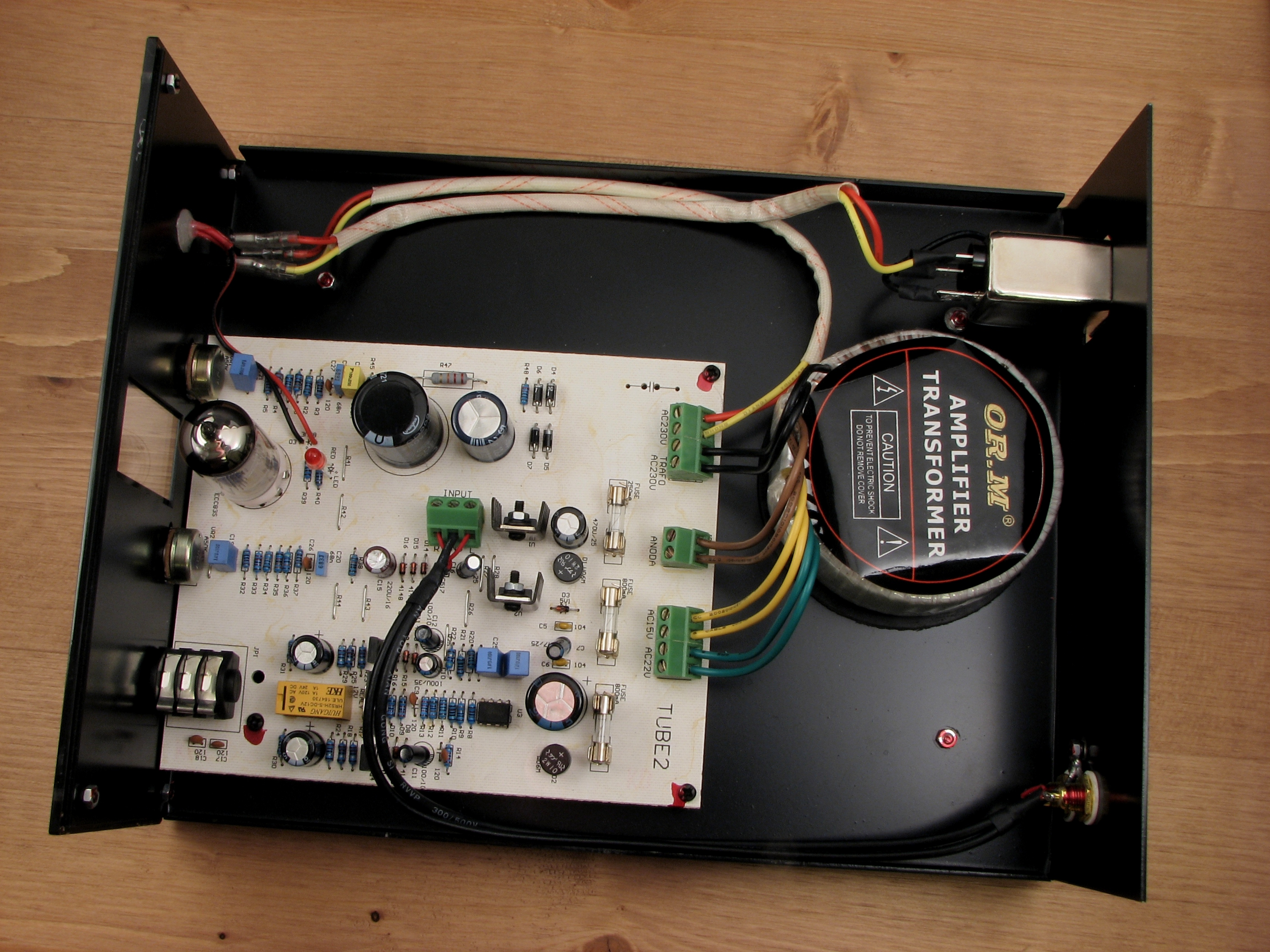
A hybrid headphone amplifier with the chassis cover removed.

Most headphone amplifiers support a higher voltage output and therefore higher power (volume) levels. Whereas most portable electronics are powered by a 1.8, 2.5 or 3.3 Vpp supply, many headphone amplifiers use 10, 18 or 24 Vpp supplies, allowing 5-20 dB higher volume. If a pair of headphones is too quiet, adding an amplifier that can output higher voltage/power will increase its volume.

=== Output impedance ===
Many headphone amplifiers have an output impedance in the range of 0.5 - 50 Ohms. The 1996 IEC 61938 standard recommended an output impedance of 120 Ohms, but in practice this is rarely used and not recommended with modern headphones. High output impedance can result in frequency response fluctuations, due to varying load impedance at different frequencies. In 2008 Stereophile Magazine published an article that showed that a 120-Ohm output impedance could cause a 5-dB error in frequency response with certain types of headphones. However, the author of the article also states: "The ramifications for subjective assessment of headphones are more troublesome because it is usually unclear what assumptions the manufacturer has made regarding source impedance."

More importantly, low output impedance can reduce distortion by improving the control that the source has over the transducer. This is often expressed as damping factor, with higher damping factors greatly reducing distortion. One company shows a 45 dB improvement in THD+N at 30 Hz for their low-impedance amplifier compared to a 30-ohm amplifier. For example, a 32 Ω headphone driven by a headphone amp with a <1 Ω output impedance would have a damping factor of >32, whereas the same headphone driven with an iPod touch 3G (7 Ω output impedance) would have a damping factor of just 4.6. If the 120 ohms recommendation is applied, the damping factor would be an unacceptably low 0.26 and consequently distortion would be significantly higher. Conversely, the same iPod touch driving a pair of 120 ohm headphones would have a respectable damping factor of 17.1, and would most likely not benefit from the addition of a lower impedance headphone amplifier.

In addition to output impedance, other specifications are relevant to choosing a headphone amplifier — THD, frequency response, IMD, output power, minimum load impedance, and other measurements are also significant. However, most of these will be improved by lowering output impedance and hence improving damping factor.

=== DIY approach ===
For those who are electronically inclined, the low-power and fairly simple nature of the headphone amplifier has made it a popular DIY project. There are many designs for headphone amplifiers posted on the Internet varying considerably in complexity and cost. A key example is the simple opamp-based CMoy design, one of the most popular headphone amplifier designs available. The simplicity of the CMoy makes it an easy build, while it can be made small enough to fit inside a tin of breath mints (including batteries). On the other hand, it is often built using op-amps that are not designed to drive loads with as low an impedance as headphones, leading to poor performance and audible differences between op-amps that would not exist in a good design.

=== Crossfeed and other audio processing ===
Crossfeeding blends the left and right stereo channels slightly, reducing the extreme channel separation which is characteristic of headphone listening in older stereo recordings, and is known to cause headaches in a small fraction of listeners. Crossfeed also improves the soundstage characteristics and makes the music sound more natural, as if one were listening to a pair of speakers. While some swear by crossfeed, many prefer amplifiers without it. The introduction of digital signal processing (DSP) technology led a number of manufacturers to introduce amplifiers with 'headphone virtualization' features. In principle, the DSP chips allow the two-driver headphone to simulate a full Dolby 5.1 (or more) surround system. When the sounds from the two headphone drivers mix, they create the phase difference the brain uses to locate the source of a sound. Through most headphones, because the right and left channels do not combine as they do with crossfeed, the illusion of sound directionality is created.

== Professional audio models ==
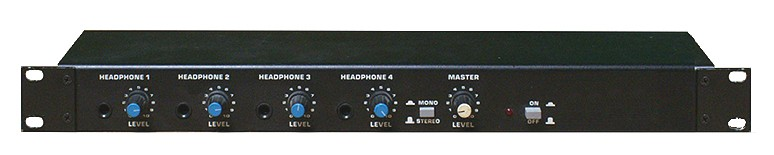
Distribution headphone amp - front panel

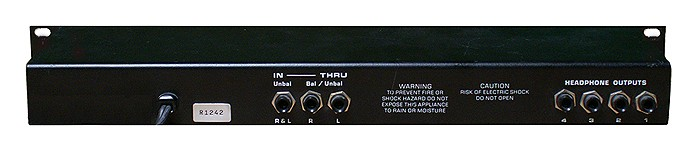
Distribution headphone amp - back panel

In pro-audio terminology, a headphone amplifier is a device that allows multiple headsets to be connected to one or more audio sources (typically balanced audio sources) at the same time to monitor sounds during a recording session, either singing or playing from the "live room" or recorded tracks. Headphone amps enable singers and musicians to be able to hear other musicians who are playing in isolation booths. They also enable audio engineers and record producers to monitor a live performance or live tracking.

Headphone amps with sub-mixing capabilities allow the listener to adjust, mix and monitor audio signals coming from multiple sources at the same time. This kind of headphone amp is often utilized during recording sessions to sub-mix playback of individual stem-mixes or instruments coming from a mixing board or a playback device. In many cases the listeners have their own sets of controls allowing them to adjust various aspects of the mix and individual and global parameters such as channel level, global loudness, bass and treble.

Distribution headphone amplifiers are specialized headphone amps allowing a single signal to be fed to multiple headsets or multiple groups of multiple headsets at the same time. Many distribution headphone amps, like the one shown here, can be cascaded by connecting the audio input of one of the amps to the cascading output, marked "THRU", of another amp.

There are also various other combinations of pro-audio headphone amps with simultaneous sub-mixing and distribution capabilities.

== See also ==
- Opamp swapping
