= George A. Philbrick =

American engineer (1913–1974)

- George A. Philbrick. Photographer: John Brook.
- Born: January 5, 1913; Belmont, Massachusetts, U.S.
- Died: December 1, 1974 (aged 61); Cotuit, Massachusetts, U.S.

George Arthur Philbrick (January 5, 1913 – December 1, 1974) was an American engineer. He was responsible, through his company George A. Philbrick Researches (GAP/R), for the 1953 commercialization and wide adoption of operational amplifiers, a now-ubiquitous component of analog electronic systems, and the invention and commercialization of electronic analog computers based on the operational amplifier principle. He also created the first electronic training simulator, the Polyphemus. The invention, or co-invention, of the operational amplifier has also been credited to a number of other people, including a war-needs driven Bell Labs team led by Clarence A. Lovell (C. A. Lovell et al., 1940 ff.) and Loebe Julie.

The actual naming of the operational amplifier likely occurred in the classic 1947 paper by John Ragazzini, et al. However analog computations using op amps as we know them today began with the work of the Clarence Lovell-led war needs group at Bell Labs, around 1940 (acknowledged generally in John Ragazzini's paper). In 1952, George A. Philbrick Researches (GAP/R) introduces the K2-W, considered the “Model T” of op amps.

== See also ==
- Bob Pease
- Bob Widlar

== Bibliography ==
- Lovell, C.A., et al., "Artillery Predictor," US Patent 2,404,081, filed May 1, 1941, issued September 24, 1946. (The mathematics of analog computer system using op amps for functions of repeating, inverting and summing amplifiers, plus differentiation).
- Lovell, C.A., et al., "Electrical Computing System," US Patent 2,404,387, filed May 1, 1941, issued July 23, 1946. (An analog computer system using op amps for control).
- Lovell, C. A. "Continuous Electrical Computation," Bell Laboratories Record, 25, March, 1947, pp. 1 14–118. (An overview of various fire-control analog computational circuits of the T10 and M9 systems, many illustrating uses of op amps).
- Nyquist, H. “Regeneration theory,” Bell System Technical Journal, vol. 11, pp. 126–147, Jan. 1932.
- Black, H.S. “Stabilized feedback amplifiers,” Bell System Technical Journal, vol. 13, pp. 1–18, Jan. 1934.
- Bode, H.W. “Relations between attenuation and phase in feedback amplifier design,” Bell System Technical Journal, vol. 19, pp. 412–454, July 1940.
- Lovell, C. A. “Continuous electrical computation,” Bell Laboratories Record, vol. 25, no. 3, pp. 114–118, Mar. 1947.
- Ragazzini, J.R., Randall, R.H., and Russell, F.A. “Analysis of problems in dynamics by electronic circuits,” Proceedings of the IRE, vol. 35, pp. 444–452, May 1947.
- Philbrick, G.A. “Designing industrial controllers by analog,” Electronics, vol. 21, no. 6, pp. 108–111, 1948. Analog Circuit Design 12 34.
