= LM3875 =

Audio power amplifier integrated circuit

LM3875 was a 56 watt amplifier chip made by Texas Instruments (previously National Semiconductor). It was very popular in the DIY audio community for its low parts count and its high-performance audio capabilities. It was the main chip inside many gainclone amplifiers which are based on the Gaincard amplifier.

This part has become obsolete and an EOL notice has been issued for it. The functional equivalent IC, the LM3886, has two additional signals that must be addressed before it can be substituted, the mute function and a virtual gnd pin.
