= Karl D. Swartzel Jr. =

Inventor of the operational amplifier

Karl Dale Swartzel Jr. (June 19, 1907 – April 23, 1998) was the inventor of the operational amplifier (or 'opamp'). He filed the patent for the 'summing amplifier' in 1941 when working at Bell Labs.
