= Power supply rejection ratio =

Measurement of an electronic circuit

In electronic systems, power supply rejection ratio (PSRR), also supply-voltage rejection ratio (k_{SVR}; SVR), is a term widely used to describe the capability of an electronic circuit to suppress any power supply variations to its output signal.

In the context of analog integrated circuits, such as operational amplifiers, the PSRR is defined as the change in supply voltage required to produce the same effect at the output as the equivalent change in (differential) input voltage. Equivalently, PSRR is defined as the ratio of open-loop signal gain to supply-to-output gain. PSRR is usually expressed in decibels. An ideal op-amp would have infinite PSRR, as the device should have no change to the output voltage with any changes to the power supply voltage.

Testing is not confined to DC (zero frequency); often an operational amplifier will also have its PSRR given at various frequencies (in which case the ratio is one of RMS amplitudes of sinewaves present at a power supply compared with the output, with gain taken into account). Unwanted oscillation, including motorboating, can occur when an amplifying stage is too sensitive to signals fed via the power supply from a later power amplifier stage.

Some manufacturers specify PSRR in terms of the offset voltage it causes at the amplifiers inputs; others specify it in terms of the output; there is no industry standard for this issue. The following formula assumes it is specified in terms of input:

$$\text{PSRR} [\text{dB}] = 10 \log_{10} \left(\frac{\Delta {V_\text{supply}}^2 {A_v}^2}{{\Delta {V_\text{out}}^2}}\right)\text{dB}$$

where $A_v$ is the voltage gain.

For example: an amplifier with a PSRR of 100 dB in a circuit to give 40 dB closed-loop gain would allow about 1 millivolt of power supply ripple to be superimposed on the output for every 1 volt of ripple in the supply. This is because

$$100\ \text{dB} - 40\ \text{dB} = 60\ \text{dB}$$.

And since that's 60 dB of rejection, the sign is negative so:

$$1\ \text{V} \cdot 10^\frac{-60}{20} = 0.001\ \text{V} = 1\ \text{mV}$$

Note:

- The PSRR doesn't necessarily have the same poles as A(s), the open-loop gain of the op-amp, but generally tends to also worsen with increasing frequency (e.g. http://focus.ti.com/lit/ds/symlink/opa2277.pdf).
- For amplifiers with both positive and negative power supplies (with respect to earth, as op-amps often have), the PSRR for each supply voltage may be separately specified (sometimes written: PSRR+ and PSRR−), but normally the PSRR is tested with opposite polarity signals applied to both supply rails at the same time (otherwise the common-mode rejection ratio (CMRR) will affect the measurement of the PSRR).
- For voltage regulators the PSRR is occasionally quoted (confusingly; to refer to output voltage change ratios), but often the concept is transferred to other terms relating changes in output voltage to input: Ripple rejection (RR) for low frequencies, line transient response for high frequencies, and line regulation for DC.
