= DIY audio =

An example of DIY audio: a functioning battery-operated DAC (Digital-to-analog converter) before installation in a box case

DIY Audio, do it yourself audio. Rather than buying a piece of possibly expensive audio equipment, such as a high-end audio amplifier or speaker, the person practicing DIY Audio will make it themselves. Alternatively, a DIYer may take an existing manufactured item of vintage era and update or modify it. The benefits of doing so include the satisfaction of creating something enjoyable, the possibility that the equipment made or updated is of higher quality than commercially available products and the pleasure of creating a custom-made device for which no exact equivalent is marketed. Other motivations for DIY audio can include getting audio components at a lower cost, the entertainment of using the item, and being able to ensure quality of workmanship.

== History ==
Audio DIY came to prominence in the 1950s to 1960s, as audio reproduction was relatively new and the technology complex. Audio reproduction equipment, and in particular high performance equipment, was not generally offered at the retail level. Kits and designs were available for consumers to build their own equipment. Famous vacuum tube kits from Dynaco, Heathkit, and McIntosh, as well as solid state (transistor) kits from Hafler allowed for consumers to build their own hi fidelity systems. Books and magazines were published which explained new concepts regarding the design and operation of vacuum tube and (later) transistor circuits.

While audio equipment has become easily accessible in the current day and age, there still exists an interest in building and repairing one's own equipment including, but not limited to; pre-amplifiers, amplifiers, speakers, cables, CD players and turntables. Today, a network of companies, parts vendors, and on-line communities exist to foster this interest. DIY is especially active in loudspeaker and in tube amplification. Both are relatively simple to design and fabricate without access to sophisticated industrial equipment. Both enable the builder to pick and choose between various available parts, on matters of price as well as quality, allow for extensive experimentation, and offer the chance to use exotic or highly labor-intensive solutions, which would be expensive for a manufacturer to implement, but only require personal labor by the DIYer, which is a source of satisfaction to them.

== Construction issues ==
Since the 1960s, integrated circuits make construction of DIY audio systems easier, but the proliferation of surface mount components (which are small and sometimes difficult to solder with a soldering iron) and fine pitch printed circuit boards (PCBs) can make the physical act of construction more difficult. Nevertheless, surface mounting is often used, as are conventional PCBs and electronic components, while some enthusiasts insist on using old-style perforated cardboard onto which individual components are hardwired and soldered. Test equipment is readily available for purchase and enables convenient testing of parts and systems. Specifications of parts and components are readily accessible through the Internet including data sheets and equipment designs.

It has become easier to make audio components from scratch rather than from kits due to the availability of CAD software for printed circuit board (PCB) layouts and electronic circuit simulation. Such software can be free, and a trial version may also be used. PCB vendors are more accessible than ever, and can manufacture PCBs in small quantities for the do-it-yourselfer. In fact, kits and chemicals for self-manufacturing one's own PCB can be obtained. Electronic parts and components are accessible online or in speciality shops, and various high-end parts vendors exist. On the other hand, a wide variety of kits, designs and premanufactured PCBs are available for almost any type of audio component.

To construct a device takes more than knowledge of circuits, many would urge that the mechanical aspects of cabinets, cases and chassis' are the most time consuming aspects of audio DIY. Drilling, metalworking and physical measurements are critical to constructing almost any DIY audio project, especially speakers. Measuring equipment such as a Vernier caliper is often essential. Woodworking skills are required to construct wooden enclosures (e.g. for speakers), with some enthusiasts going beyond traditional woodworking to CNC turning, and luxurious veneers and lacquers. Room acoustics solutions are also popular among DIYers, as they can be made with inexpensive and readily available insulating materials, and can be dimensioned to fit each particular room in a precise and aesthetically pleasing way.

DIY audio involves projects directed to audio. Many DIY audio people fancy themselves to be audiophiles. These people use rare and expensive parts and components in their projects. Examples are the use of silver wire, expensive capacitors, non-standard solders of various alloys, and use of parts that have been cryogenically cooled.

Vacuum tube or valve projects are common in audio DIY. While, for mass market audio components, the vacuum tube has been replaced in modern times with the transistor and IC, the vacuum tube remains prominent in specialty high end audio equipment. Thus, interest exists in building components using vacuum tubes, and the vacuum tube is still widely available. There is a wide variety of tubes manufactured nowadays, and many tubes on the market are advertised as NOS; not all of the latter being genuinely NOS. Circuits utilizing tubes often are far less complicated than those utilizing transistors or op-amps. Tube enthusiasts often use transformers, sometimes custom-made ones, or even hand-wind their own transformers using cores and wire of their own choice. Note that vacuum tube projects almost always use dangerously high voltages and should be undertaken with due care.

In case lead-containing solder is used instead of RoHS-compliant solder, appropriate environmental precautions with regard to lead and lead products should be taken.

== Tweaking and tweakers ==
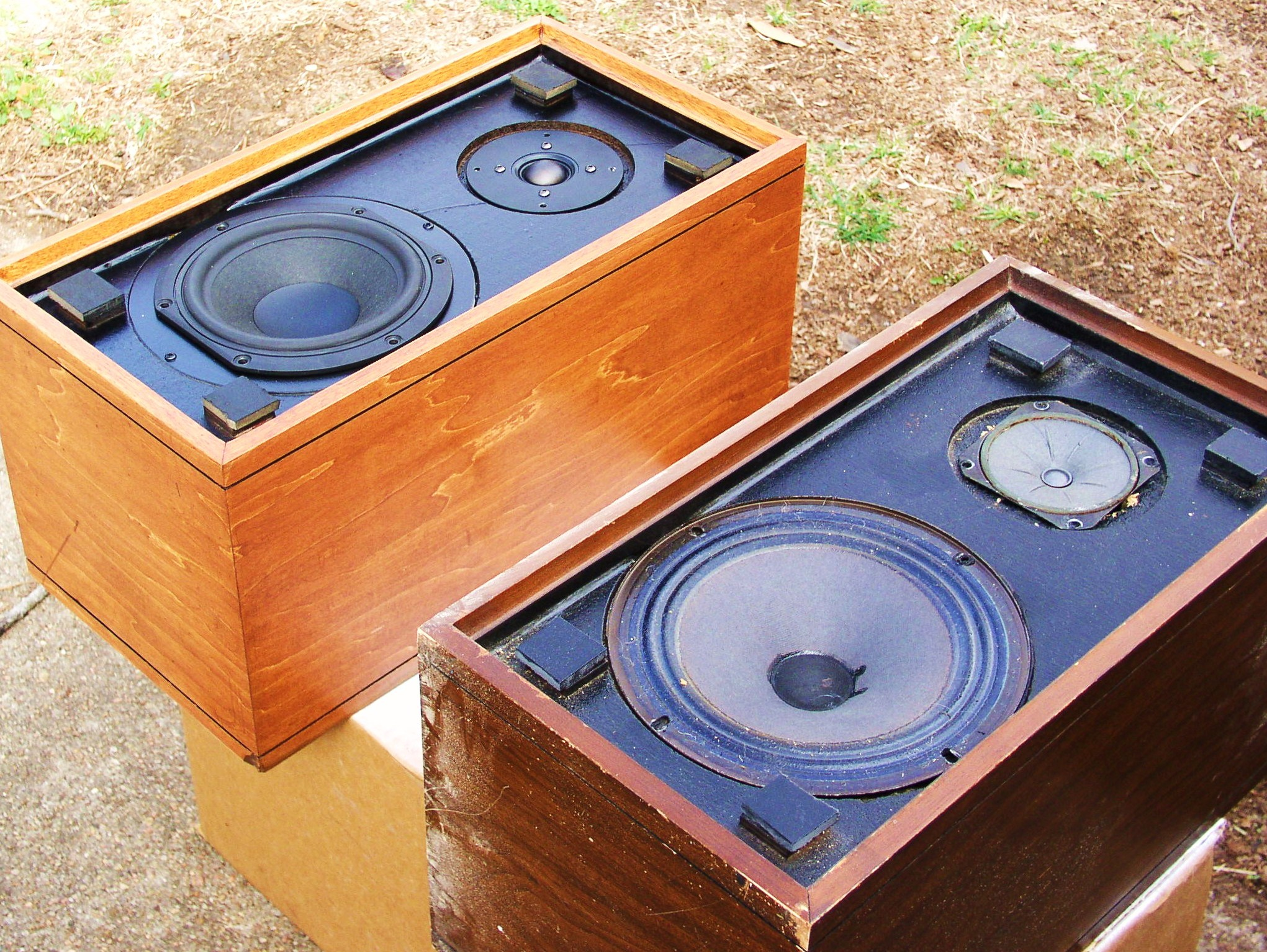
Rebuilt and refinished Magnavox wood speaker using a Dayton 2 way crossover, peerless 6 1/2 inch woofer, and Usher Audio 1 1/8 inch tweeter

DIY audio can also involve tweaking of mass market components. It is thought that mass market audio components are compromised by the use of cheap or inferior internal parts that can be easily replaced with high quality substitutes. As a result, an audio component of improved characteristics may be obtained for relatively low cost. Some common changes include replacing opamps, replacing capacitors (recap), or even replacing resistors in order to increase signal-to-noise ratio. Changing an audio component in this way is similar to what a tweaker or modder does with a personal computer.

== Circuit bending ==
Circuit bending is the creative customization of the circuits within electronic devices such as low voltage, battery-powered guitar effects, and small digital synthesizers to create new musical or visual instruments and sound generators. Emphasizing spontaneity and randomness, the techniques of circuit bending have been commonly associated with noise music, though many more conventional contemporary musicians and musical groups have been known to experiment with bent instruments. Circuit bending usually involves dismantling the machine and adding components such as switches and potentiometers that alter the circuit.

== Cloning and cloners ==
Another common practice in the DIY audio community is to attempt to clone or copy a pre-existing design or component from a commercial manufacturer. This involves obtaining a lawful public version of, or lawfully reverse engineering, the circuit schematics for the design, and/or even the publicly available PCB layouts. Such a clone will not be a perfect copy since different brands and types of parts (often newer parts) will be used, and mechanical aspects of construction will likely differ. However, the circuit or other distinguishing features should be close to the original.

There are many reasons for wanting to recreate an existing design. The design might be historically important and/or out of production, so the only way to obtain the component is to build it. The design might be very simple so copying it is easily done. The commercial product might be very expensive but its design known, so it may be built for far less than it cost to be purchased. The original design may have some sentimental value to the person building the recreation, and the design built for the memories in one's past. The copy may be made to test or evaluate design concepts or principles in the original.

As an example, a well known clone includes amplifiers using high power integrated circuits, such as the National Semiconductor LM3875 and LM3886. The use of a high power IC as part of a quality audio amplifier was popularized by the 47 Labs Gaincard amplifier, and thus the DIY amplifiers using power ICs are often called chipamps or Gainclones.

Usually cloning additionally involves improving or tweaking (see above) the original design, potentially by using more modern components (in the case of discontinued designs,) higher quality parts, or more efficient board layout.

== Operational amplifier swapping ==
Operational amplifier (op-amps) swapping is the process of replacing an operational amplifier in audio equipment with a different one, in an attempt to improve performance or change the perceived sound quality. Op-amps are used in most audio devices, and most op-amps have the same pinouts, making replacement fairly simple. If the new device's parameters sometimes do not match it can lead to problems like high-frequency oscillation.
