= Wired logic connection =

Logic gate that implements boolean algebra

A wired logic connection is a logic gate that implements boolean algebra (logic) using only passive components such as diodes and resistors. Limitations include the lack of amplification to provide level restoration and its constant ohmic heating for most logic (particularly more than CMOS) which indirectly limits density of components and speed.

Wired logic works by exploiting the high impedance of open collector outputs (and its variants: open emitter, open drain, or open source) by just adding a pull-up or pull-down resistor to a voltage source, or can be applied to push–pull outputs by using diode logic (with the disadvantage of incurring a diode drop voltage loss).

== Active-high wired OR connection ==
"Wired OR" logic connection using a pull-down resistor after two open-emitter buffers (the ⎏ symbol indicates an open emitter or similar output). This OR gate can also be easily extended with more inputs.

The wired OR connection electrically performs the Boolean logic operation of an OR gate.

When all inputs are LOW, they all present high impedance, and the pull-down resistor pulls the output voltage LOW, but if any input is HIGH, they pull the output HIGH:

Inputs		Output
A	B	A OR B
LOW	LOW	LOW
LOW	HIGH	HIGH
HIGH	LOW	HIGH
HIGH	HIGH	HIGH

When driving a load, the LOW output is raised by the pull-down's voltage drop, though the HIGH output is almost the supply voltage (5V). But if diode logic is used, each input requires a diode, and the HIGH output voltage will additionally be lowered by the diode's forward voltage.

== Active-high wired AND connection ==
Diode circuit implementing AND in active-high logic.

The wired AND connection is a form of AND gate.

When all inputs are HIGH, they all present high impedance, and the pull-up resistor pulls output voltage HIGH, but if any input is LOW, they pull the output LOW:

Inputs		Output
A	B	A AND B
LOW	LOW	LOW
LOW	HIGH	LOW
HIGH	LOW	LOW
HIGH	HIGH	HIGH

When driving a load, the HIGH output is reduced by the pull-up's voltage drop. If diode logic is used, each input requires a diode, and the LOW output voltage will additionally be raised by the diode's forward voltage. Care should be taken to ensure the output still lies within valid voltage levels.

== Reversing active level ==
An active-high wired AND can be treated as active-low wired OR (and an active-high wired OR can be treated as active-low wired AND), by using active-low logic (or negative logic) and applying De Morgan's laws.

== Compatibility of wired AND OR using diodes ==
Wired AND in diode logic

Wired OR in diode logic

Diode logic uses a diode for each input in addition to a shared pull-up resistor (for wired AND) or a pull-down resistor (for wired OR). However, each stage of diode logic reduces output voltage levels. So without amplification, the output voltage may not be compatible with the primary logic family. Diode logic alone can't create a NOT gate.

== Applications ==
=== Simplify computer bus connection ===
Wired-OR signaling is common for multipoint bus standards, e.g. Controller Area Network (CAN), Small Computer Systems Interface (SCSI), IEEE-488 (GPIB), and IEEE-896 (BTL). It provides collision detection and OR gating of all outputs on signal line(s). Wired-logic is often used by multipoint busses during bus arbitration and sometimes during data transfer. It simplifies sharing a bit of information among separated nodes without the cost of a sophisticated protocol.

== See also ==
- Bus (computing)
- Diode logic
- Logic gate
