= Hans Camenzind =

Swiss electronics engineer (1934–2012)

Hans R. Camenzind
- Camenzind in 1971
- Born: Hans R. Camenzind; 1934; Zürich, Switzerland
- Died: August 8, 2012; San Francisco, California, United States
- Other name: Hans Rudolph Camenzind
- Education: Northeastern University; University of Santa Clara
- Occupations: Electrical Engineer, Inventor
- Known for: Development of 555 timer IC
- Spouse: Pia Camenzind

Hans R. Camenzind (Swiss Standard German: [ˈkaːməntsɪnd]; 1934 – 8 August 2012) was an electronics engineer known for designing the 555 timer IC in 1971 under contract to Signetics. He was the inventor on 20 US patents. Camenzind also wrote three books and numerous technical articles, and lectured at the University of Santa Clara.

== Background and education ==
Camenzind was born and raised in Zürich, Switzerland, where he went to college. In 1960 he moved to the United States, first receiving an MSEE from Northeastern University and then an MBA from the University of Santa Clara. Camenzind taught circuit design in the morning, then attended classes at the same university at night working towards a Master's degree in Business Administration.

== Career ==
In 1962, Camenzind joined the Laboratory for Physical Science at P.R. Mallory in Burlington, Massachusetts. After six years of research, Camenzind moved to California in 1968 to join Signetics, but two years later he felt Signetics "lost its way" and resigned to write a book. He told them he didn't want to come back, and wanted to work as a consultant and independent designer, he proposed the 555 design in 1971. He then started Interdesign, a semiconductor design company, which he headed for seven years before selling out to Ferranti. Following the sale of Interdesign, Camenzind became an independent analog IC design consultant.

During his career Camenzind designed the first integrated class D amplifier, introduced the IC phase-locked loop, invented the semicustom IC, and created the legendary 555 timer. By 2006, he had designed 140 standard and custom ICs, such as:

- Signetics LM555
- Signetics LM565
- Signetics LM566
- Signetics LM567
- Zetex Semiconductors ZSCT1555

== Books ==
Camenzind wrote three books and numerous technical articles. His last book, Much Ado About Almost Nothing, published in February 2007, is a general audience book about the history of electronics. Other books include, Designing Analog Chips and, under the pen name John Penter, he also wrote, Circumstantial Evidence, a book about religion.
