= Digital current loop interface =

Serial communications scheme

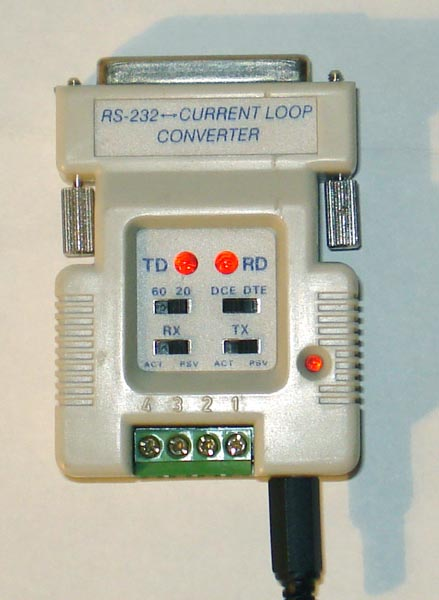
RS-232 / Current loop converter

For serial communications, a current loop is a communication interface that uses current instead of voltage for signaling. Current loops can be used over moderately long distances (tens of kilometres), and can be interfaced with optically isolated links.

There are a variety of such systems, but one based on a 20 mA current level was used by the Teletype Model 33 and was particularly common on minicomputers and early microcomputer which used these as computer terminals. As a result, most computer terminals also supported this standard into the 1980s.

== History ==
Long before RS-232 was made a recommended standard in 1960, current loops were used to send digital data in serial form for teleprinters. More than two teleprinters could be connected on a single circuit allowing a simple form of networking. Older teleprinters used a 60 mA current loop. Later machines, such as the Teletype Model 33, operated on a lower 20 mA current level and most early minicomputers featured a 20 mA current loop interface, with an RS-232 port generally available as a more expensive option. The original IBM PC serial port card had provisions for a 20 mA current loop.

== Signaling conventions ==
A digital current loop uses the absence of current for high (space or break), and the presence of current in the loop for low (mark). This is done to ensure that on normal conditions there is always current flowing and in the event of a line being cut the flow stops indefinitely, immediately raising the alarm of the event usually as the heavy noise of the teleprinter not being synchronized, something that would not have been possible if the idle state had been no current flowing.

== Electrical characteristics ==
The maximum resistance for a current loop is limited by the available voltage. Current loop interfaces usually use voltages much higher than those found on an RS-232 interface, and cannot be interconnected with voltage-type inputs without some form of voltage level translator circuit.

For full-duplex communication between two devices, two pairs of wires would be used. There is no common standard for current loop interfaces, so details such as timing, connectors, wire color codes, and so on, are all application specific.

== See also ==
- MIDI, a digital current loop interface limited to 5 milliamps and 5 volts.
