= Logic level =

Finite states of a digital signal

In digital circuits, a logic level is one of a finite number of states that a digital signal can inhabit. Logic levels are usually represented by the voltage difference between the signal and ground, although other standards exist. The range of voltage levels that represent each state depends on the logic family being used. A logic-level shifter can be used to allow compatibility between different circuits.

== 2-level logic ==
In binary logic the two levels are logical high and logical low, which generally correspond to binary numbers 1 and 0 respectively or truth values true and false respectively. Signals with one of these two levels can be used in Boolean algebra for digital circuit design or analysis.

=== Active state ===
Diagram of RS-232 signaling an uppercase "K" character as seen when probed by an oscilloscope. The RS-232 electric signaling uses active low (negative logic). The digital data representing "K" (0x4b) as 7-bit ASCII is framed as "7E1" with 1 start bit, 7 data bits, even parity, 1 stop bit.

The use of either the higher or the lower voltage level to represent either logic state is arbitrary. The two options are active high (positive logic) and active low (negative logic). Active-high and active-low states can be mixed at will: for example, a read-only memory integrated circuit may have a chip-select signal that is active-low, but the data and address bits are conventionally active-high. Occasionally a logic design is simplified by inverting the choice of active level (see De Morgan's laws).

Binary signal representations
Logic level	Active-high signal	Active-low signal
Logical high	1	0
Logical low	0	1

The name of an active-low signal is historically written with a bar above it to distinguish it from an active-high signal. For example, the name Q̅, read Q bar or Q not, represents an active-low signal. The conventions commonly used are:

- a bar above (Q̅)
- a leading slash (/Q)
- a leading exclamation mark (!Q)
- a lower-case n prefix or suffix (nQ, Qn or Q_n)
- an upper-case N suffix (Q_N)
- a trailing # (Q#), or
- an _B or _L suffix (Q_B or Q_L).

Many control signals in electronics are active-low signals (usually reset lines, chip-select lines and so on). Logic families such as TTL can sink more current than they can source, so fanout and noise immunity increase. It also allows for wired-OR logic if the logic gates are open-collector/open-drain with a pull-up resistor. Examples of this are the I²C bus, CAN bus, and PCI bus.

Some signals have a meaning in both states and notation may indicate such. For example, it is common to have a read/write line designated R/W̅, indicating that the signal is high in case of a read and low in case of a write.

=== Logic voltage levels ===
The two logical states are usually represented by two different voltages, but two different currents are used in some logic signaling, like digital current loop interface and current-mode logic. High and low thresholds are specified for each logic family. When below the low threshold, the signal is low. When above the high threshold, the signal is high. Intermediate levels are undefined, resulting in highly implementation-specific circuit behavior.

It is usual to allow some tolerance in the voltage levels used; for example, 0 to 2 volts might represent logic 0, and 3 to 5 volts logic 1. A voltage of 2 to 3 volts would be invalid and occur only in a fault condition or during a logic-level transition. However, few logic circuits can detect such a condition, and most devices will interpret the signal simply as high or low in an undefined or device-specific manner. Some logic devices incorporate Schmitt trigger inputs, whose behavior is much better defined in the threshold region and have increased resilience to small variations in the input voltage. The problem of the circuit designer is to avoid circumstances that produce intermediate levels, so that the circuit behaves predictably.

Examples of binary logic levels
Technology	L voltage	H voltage	Notes
CMOS	0 V to 30% V_{DD}	70% V_{DD} to V_{DD}	V_{DD} = supply voltage
TTL	0 V to 0.8 V	2 V to V_{CC}	V_{CC} = 5 V ±5% (7400 commercial family) or ±10% (5400 military family)

Nearly all digital circuits use a consistent logic level for all internal signals. That level, however, varies from one system to another. Interconnecting any two logic families often required special techniques such as additional pull-up resistors or purpose-built interface circuits known as level shifters. A level shifter connects one digital circuit that uses one logic level to another digital circuit that uses another logic level. Often two level shifters are used, one at each system: A line driver converts from internal logic levels to standard interface line levels; a line receiver converts from interface levels to internal voltage levels.

For example, TTL levels are different from those of CMOS. Generally, a TTL output does not rise high enough to be reliably recognized as a logic 1 by a CMOS input, especially if it is only connected to a high-input-impedance CMOS input that does not source significant current. This problem was solved by the invention of the 74HCT family of devices that uses CMOS technology but TTL input logic levels. These devices only work with a 5 V power supply.

Logic supply voltages
Supply voltage	Technology	Logic families (examples)	Reference
5V, 10V, 15V	Metal CMOS	4000, 74C	
5V	TTL	7400, 74S, 74LS, 74ALS, 74F, 74H	
5V	BiCMOS	74ABT, 74BCT	
5V	CMOS (TTL I/O)	74HCT, 74AHCT, 74ACT	
3.3V, 5V	CMOS	74HC, 74AHC, 74AC	
5V	LVCMOS	74LVC, 74AXP	
3.3V	LVCMOS	74LVC, 74AUP, 74AXC, 74AXP	
2.5V	LVCMOS	74LVC, 74AUP, 74AUC, 74AXC, 74AXP	
1.8V	LVCMOS	74LVC, 74AUP, 74AUC, 74AXC, 74AXP	
1.5V	LVCMOS	74AUP, 74AUC, 74AXC, 74AXP	
1.2V	LVCMOS	74AUP, 74AUC, 74AXC, 74AXP	

== More than two levels ==
=== 3-value logic ===
Though rare, ternary computers evaluate base 3 three-valued or ternary logic using 3 voltage levels.

=== 3-state logic ===
In three-state logic, an output device can be in one of three possible states: 0, 1, or Z, with the last meaning high impedance. This is not a voltage or logic level, but means that the output is not controlling the state of the connected circuit.

=== 4-value logic ===
Four-valued logic adds a fourth state, X (don't care), meaning the value of the signal is unimportant and undefined. It means that an input is undefined, or an output signal may be chosen for implementation convenience (see Karnaugh map § Don't cares).

=== 9-level logic ===
IEEE 1164 defines 9 logic states for use in electronic design automation. The standard includes strong and weakly driven signals, high impedance and unknown and uninitialized states.

=== Multi-level cells ===
In solid-state storage devices, a multi-level cell stores data using multiple voltages. Storing n bits in one cell requires the device to reliably distinguish 2^{n} distinct voltage levels.

=== Line coding ===
Digital line codes may use more than two states to encode and transmit data more efficiently. Examples include alternate mark inversion and 4B3T from telecommunications, and pulse-amplitude modulation variants used by Ethernet over twisted pair. For instance, 100BASE-TX uses MLT-3 encoding with three differential voltage levels (−1V, 0V, +1V) while 1000BASE-T encodes data using five differential voltage levels (−1V, −0.5V, 0V, +0.5V, +1V). Once received, the line coding is converted back to binary.

== See also ==
- Logic family
- Digital current loop interface
