= Push–pull output =

Type of electronic circuit

A Class B push–pull output driver using a pair of complementary PNP and NPN bipolar junction transistors configured as emitter followers

A push–pull amplifier is a type of electronic circuit that uses a pair of active devices that alternately supply current to, or absorb current from, a connected load. This kind of amplifier can enhance both the load capacity and switching speed.

Push–pull outputs are present in TTL and CMOS digital logic circuits and in some types of amplifiers, and are usually realized by a complementary pair of transistors, one dissipating or sinking current from the load to ground or a negative power supply, and the other supplying or sourcing current to the load from a positive power supply.

A push–pull amplifier is more efficient than a single-ended class-A amplifier. The output power that can be achieved is higher than the continuous dissipation rating of either transistor or tube used alone and increases the power available for a given supply voltage. Symmetrical construction of the two sides of the amplifier means that even-order harmonics are cancelled, which can reduce distortion. DC current is cancelled in the output, allowing a smaller output transformer to be used than in a single-ended amplifier. However, the push–pull amplifier requires a phase-splitting component that adds complexity and cost to the system; use of center-tapped transformers for input and output is a common technique but adds weight and restricts performance. If the two parts of the amplifier do not have identical characteristics, distortion can be introduced as the two halves of the input waveform are amplified unequally. Crossover distortion can be created near the zero point of each cycle as one device is cut off and the other device enters its active region.

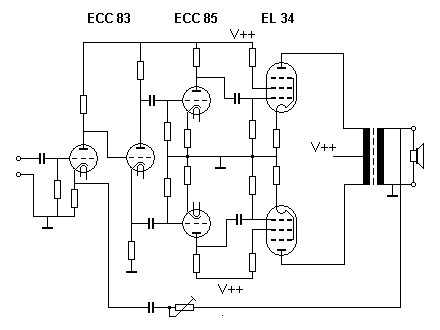
A vacuum tube amplifier often used a center-tapped output transformer to combine the outputs of tubes connected in push–pull.

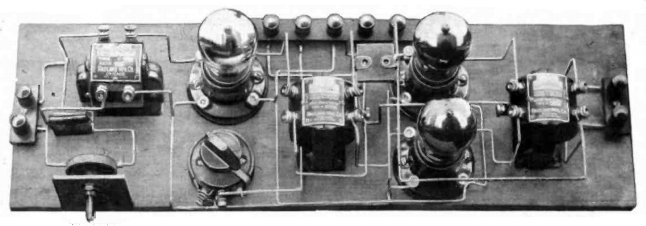
Transformer coupled vacuum tube push-pull audio amplifier from 1924. The two triode output tubes are on right.

A Magnavox stereo tube push–pull amplifier, circa 1960, utilizes two 6BQ5 output tubes per channel. The two pairs of push-pull tubes are visible in front of the output transformers.

Push–pull circuits are widely used in many amplifier output stages. A pair of audion tubes connected in push–pull is described in Edwin H. Colpitts' US patent 1137384 granted in 1915, although the patent does not specifically claim the push–pull connection. The technique was well known at that time and the principle had been claimed in an 1895 patent predating electronic amplifiers. Possibly the first commercial product using a push–pull amplifier was the RCA Balanced amplifier released in 1924 for use with their Radiola III regenerative broadcast receiver. By using a pair of low-power vacuum tubes in push–pull configuration, the amplifier allowed the use of a loudspeaker instead of headphones, while providing acceptable battery life with low standby power consumption. The technique continues to be used in audio, radio frequency, digital, and power electronics systems today.

== Digital circuits ==
Circuit of TTL NAND gate has a 'totem pole output' stage (right) consisting of two NPN transistors in push pull. When at least one of the inputs is low, transistor V_{1} is turned on, V_{2} is turned off, V_{3} is turned on and V_{4} off, pulling output voltage high. When both inputs are high, V_{2} is on, V_{3} is off and V_{4} is turned on, pulling output low.

In digital logic families such as TTL, the output stage often uses a push–pull configuration known as a totem-pole output. The upper transistor provides active pull-up drive. The lower transistor provides active pull-down drive. This gives low output impedance in both logic states and faster switching than passive pull-up designs. Because the two transistors are drawn stacked vertically in schematics, the arrangement is called a “totem-pole” output.

A limitation of simple push–pull outputs is that they cannot be directly connected together. If one output drives high while another drives low, large currents can flow and the resulting logic level is undefined. To permit connection to a shared bus, some logic devices provide a third state in which both output transistors are turned off. In this condition the output presents a high impedance and is described as three-state (or tri-state).

An alternative to push–pull output is a single switch that disconnects or connects the load to ground (called an open collector or open drain output), or a single switch that disconnects or connects the load to the power supply (called an open-emitter or open-source output), usually with a pull-up resistor or pull-down resistor passively pulling the signal the opposite way.

== Analog circuits ==
A conventional amplifier stage which is not push–pull is sometimes called single-ended to distinguish it from a push–pull circuit.

In analog push–pull power amplifiers the two output devices operate in antiphase (i.e. 180° apart). The two antiphase outputs are connected to the load in a way that causes the signal outputs to be added, but distortion components due to non-linearity in the output devices to be subtracted from each other; if the non-linearity of both output devices is similar, distortion is much reduced. Symmetrical push–pull circuits must cancel even order harmonics, like 2f, 4f, 6f and therefore promote odd order harmonics, like f, 3f, 5f when driven into the nonlinear range.

A push–pull amplifier produces less distortion than a single-ended one. This allows a class-A or AB push–pull amplifier to have less distortion for the same power as the same devices used in single-ended configuration. Distortion can occur at the moment the outputs switch: the "hand-off" is not perfect. This is called crossover distortion. Class AB and class B dissipate less power for the same output than class A; general distortion can be kept low by negative feedback, and crossover distortion can be reduced by adding a 'bias current' to smoothen the hand-off.

A class-B push–pull amplifier is more efficient than a class-A power amplifier because each output device amplifies only half the output waveform and is cut off during the opposite half. It can be shown that the theoretical full power efficiency (AC power in load compared to DC power consumed) of a push–pull stage is approximately 78.5%. This compares with a class-A amplifier which has efficiency of 25% if directly driving the load and no more than 50% for a transformer coupled output. A push–pull amplifier draws little power with zero signal, compared to a class-A amplifier that draws constant power. Power dissipation in the output devices is roughly one-fifth of the output power rating of the amplifier. A class-A amplifier, by contrast, must use a device capable of dissipating several times the output power.

The output of the amplifier may be direct-coupled to the load, coupled by a transformer, or connected through a dc blocking capacitor. Where both positive and negative power supplies are used, the load can be returned to the midpoint (ground) of the power supplies. A transformer allows a single polarity power supply to be used, but limits the low-frequency response of the amplifier. Similarly, with a single power supply, a capacitor can be used to block the DC level at the output of the amplifier.

Where bipolar junction transistors are used, the bias network must compensate for the negative temperature coefficient of the transistors' base to emitter voltage. This can be done by including a small value resistor between emitter and output. Also, the driving circuit can have silicon diodes mounted in thermal contact with the output transistors to provide compensation.

=== Push–pull transistor output stages ===
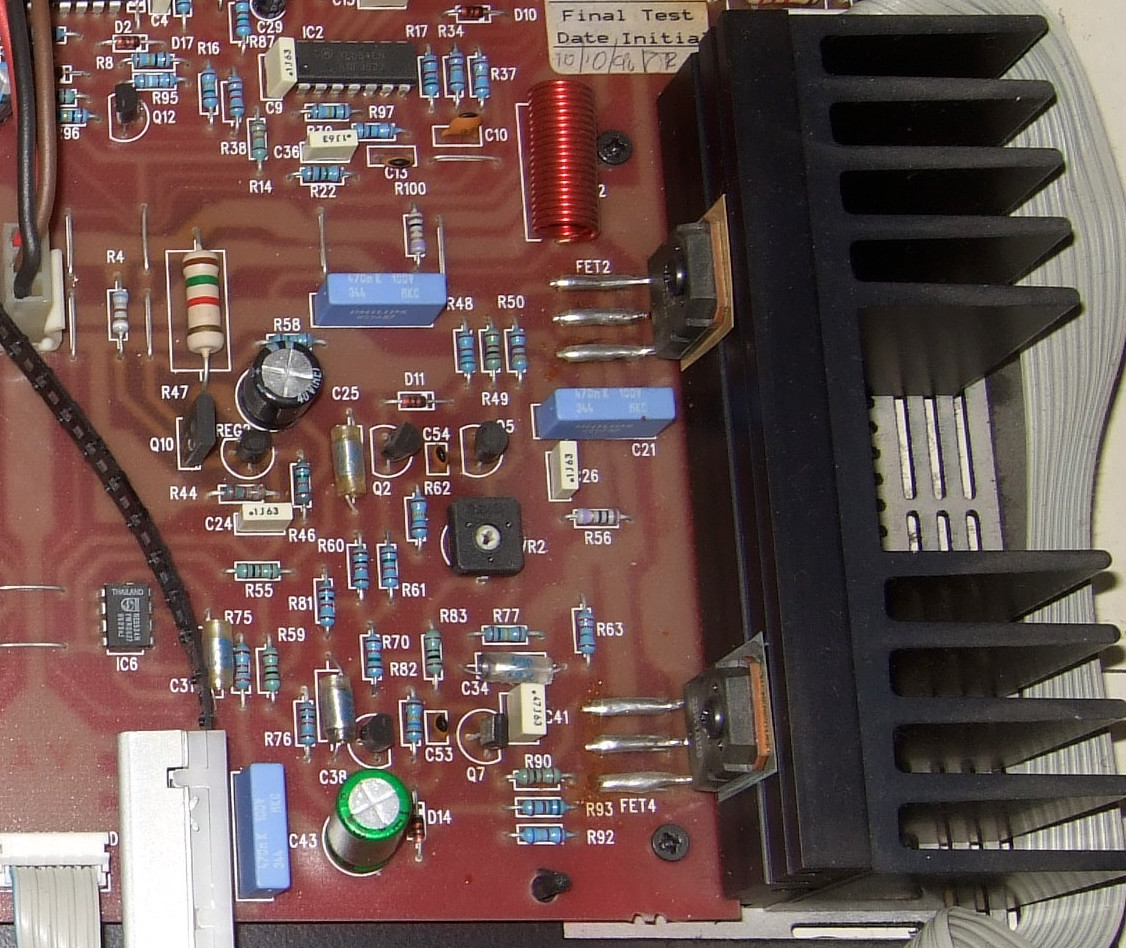
Typical transistor output stage of one channel of a 65 watt stereo amplifier from 1993. The 2 MOSFET push-pull output transistors (FET2, FET4) are bolted to the black heat sink. They are driven by transistors Q2, Q5, Q6, and Q7

Categories include:

==== Transformer-output transistor power amplifiers ====
The GE 1964 Transistor manual shows a 12 Volt audio amplifier, using a pair of (PNP) 2N1415 output transistors. The input and the output are both transformer coupled, 500 mW of audio output is claimed.

This topology is used in RF amplifiers, where the required transformers are small. A March 1999 QST article notes that even harmonics are largely cancelled, but that odd harmonics must be filtered out.

==== Totem pole push–pull output stages ====
Two matched transistors of the same polarity can be arranged to supply opposite halves of each cycle without the need for an output transformer.. Patent US3417339A describes an audio amplifier with totem-pole NPN transistors. The circuit is described as allowing for the use of lower-cost semiconductors.

==== Symmetrical push–pull ====
Each half of the output pair "mirror" the other, in that an NPN (or N-Channel FET) device in one half will be matched by a PNP (or P-Channel FET) in the other. This type of arrangement tends to give lower distortion than quasi-symmetric stages because even harmonics are cancelled more effectively with greater symmetry.

The Hafler DH-220 is a full-symmetrical push-pull audio amplifier outputing 260W into a 4 ohm load. Circuit analysis in an Audio Xpress article.

==== Quasi-symmetrical push–pull ====
In the past, when good-quality PNP complements for high-power NPN silicon transistors were limited, many designs used identical NPN output devices, but fed them from complementary PNP and NPN driver circuits (typically one Darlington pair and one Sziklai pair). The combination can behave close to symmetrical, though never as good as a circuit having full symmetry (two Darlington pairs or two Sziklai pairs). Mismatched gain on the halves of each cycle could increase distortion.

==== Super-symmetric output stages ====
Employing some duplication in the whole driver circuit, to allow symmetrical drive circuits, can improve matching further, although driver asymmetry is a small fraction of the distortion generating process. Using a bridge-tied load arrangement allows a much greater degree of matching between positive and negative halves, compensating for the inevitable small differences between NPN and PNP devices.

==== Square-law push–pull ====
The output devices, usually MOSFETs or vacuum tubes, are configured so that their square-law transfer characteristics (that generate second-harmonic distortion if used in a single-ended circuit) cancel distortion to a large extent. That is, as one transistor's gate-source voltage increases, the drive to the other device is reduced by the same amount and the drain (or plate) current change in the second device approximately corrects for the non-linearity in the increase of the first.

=== Push–pull tube (valve) output stages ===
Vacuum tubes (valves) are not available in complementary types (as are PNP and NPN transistors), so the tube push–pull amplifier has a pair of identical output tubes or groups of tubes with the control grids driven in antiphase. These tubes may drive current through the two halves of the primary winding of a center-tapped output transformer. Signal currents add, while the distortion signals due to the non-linear characteristic curves of the tubes subtract. These amplifiers were first designed long before the development of solid-state electronic devices; they are still in use by both audiophiles and musicians who consider them to sound better.

Vacuum tube push–pull amplifiers usually use an output transformer, although Output-transformerless (OTL) tube stages exist. The phase-splitter stage is usually another vacuum tube but a transformer with a center-tapped secondary winding was occasionally used in some designs. Because these are essentially square-law devices, the comments regarding distortion cancellation mentioned above apply to most push–pull tube designs when operated in class A (i.e. neither device is driven to its non-conducting state).

A Single Ended Push–Pull (SEPP, SRPP or mu-follower) output stage, originally called the Series-Balanced amplifier (US patent 2,310,342, Feb 1943). is similar to a totem-pole arrangement for transistors in that two devices are in series between the power supply rails, but the input drive goes only to one of the devices, the bottom one of the pair; hence the (seemingly contradictory) Single-Ended description. The output is taken from the cathode of the top (not directly driven) device, which acts part way between a constant current source and a cathode follower but receiving some drive from the plate (anode) circuit of the bottom device. The drive to each tube therefore might not be equal, but the circuit tends to keep the current through the bottom device somewhat constant throughout the signal, increasing the power gain and reducing distortion compared with a true single-tube single-ended output stage.

The White Cathode Follower is similar to the SEPP design above, but the signal input is to the grid of the top tube which acts as a cathode follower. The bottom tube (in common cathode configuration) is fed a signal derived from the current in the plate (anode) of the top device. It essentially reverses the roles of the two devices in SEPP. The bottom tube acts part way between a constant current sink and an equal partner in the push–pull workload. Again, the drive to each tube therefore might not be equal.

Transistor versions of the SEPP and White follower include the super-source follower.

==== Ultra-linear push–pull ====
A so-called ultra-linear push–pull amplifier uses either pentodes or tetrodes with their screen grid fed from a percentage of the primary voltage on the output transformer. This gives efficiency and distortion that is a good compromise between triode (or triode-strapped) power amplifier circuits and conventional pentode or tetrode output circuits where the screen is fed from a relatively constant voltage source.

== See also ==
- Open collector
- Push–pull converter for more details on implementation
- Single-ended triode
