= High impedance =

Node in a circuit restricting current flow

In electronics, high impedance means that an electrical contact point in a circuit (a node) allows a relatively small amount of current through, per unit of voltage applied to that point. High impedance circuits show low current for (possibly) high voltage, whereas low impedance circuits are the opposite: they show low voltage for (possibly) high current. Values for electrical impedance are measured in units of Ohms (Ω), similar to resistance.

High-impedance inputs are preferred on measuring instruments such as voltmeters or oscilloscopes. In audio systems, a high-impedance input may be required for use with devices such as crystal microphones or other devices with inherently high internal impedance.

== Analog electronics ==
In analog circuits a high impedance node is an electrical contact point that does not have any low impedance path to any other node in the frequency range being considered. Since, to some extent, the words low and high are relative, it is possible in principle for some nodes impedance to be described as low impedance in one context, and high impedance in another; so the node (perhaps a signal source or amplifier input) has relatively low currents for the voltages involved.

High-impedance nodes have higher thermal noise voltages and are more prone to capacitive and inductive noise pick up. When testing, they are often difficult to probe as the impedance of an oscilloscope or multimeter can heavily affect the signal or voltage on the node. High impedance signal outputs are characteristic of some transducers (such as crystal pickups); they require a very high impedance load from the amplifier to which they are connected. Vacuum tube amplifiers, and field effect transistors more easily supply high-impedance inputs than bipolar junction transistor-based amplifiers, although current buffer circuits or step-down transformers can match a high-impedance input source to a low impedance amplifier.

== Digital electronics ==
In digital circuits, a high impedance (also known as hi-Z, tri-stated, or floating) output is not being driven to any defined logic level by the output circuit. The signal is neither driven to a logical high nor low level; this third condition leads to the description "tri-stated". Such a signal can be seen as an open circuit because connecting it to a low impedance circuit will not affect that circuit; it will instead itself be pulled to the same voltage as the actively driven output. The combined input/output pins found on many ICs are actually tri-state capable outputs which have been internally connected to inputs (resulting in three-state logic or four-valued logic). This is the basis for bus-systems in computers, among many other uses.

The high-impedance state of a given node in a circuit cannot be verified by a voltage measurement alone. A pull-up resistor (or pull-down resistor) can be used as a medium-impedance source to try to pull the wire to a high (or low) voltage level. If the node is not in a high-impedance state, extra current from the resistor will not significantly affect its voltage level.
