= List of linear integrated circuits =

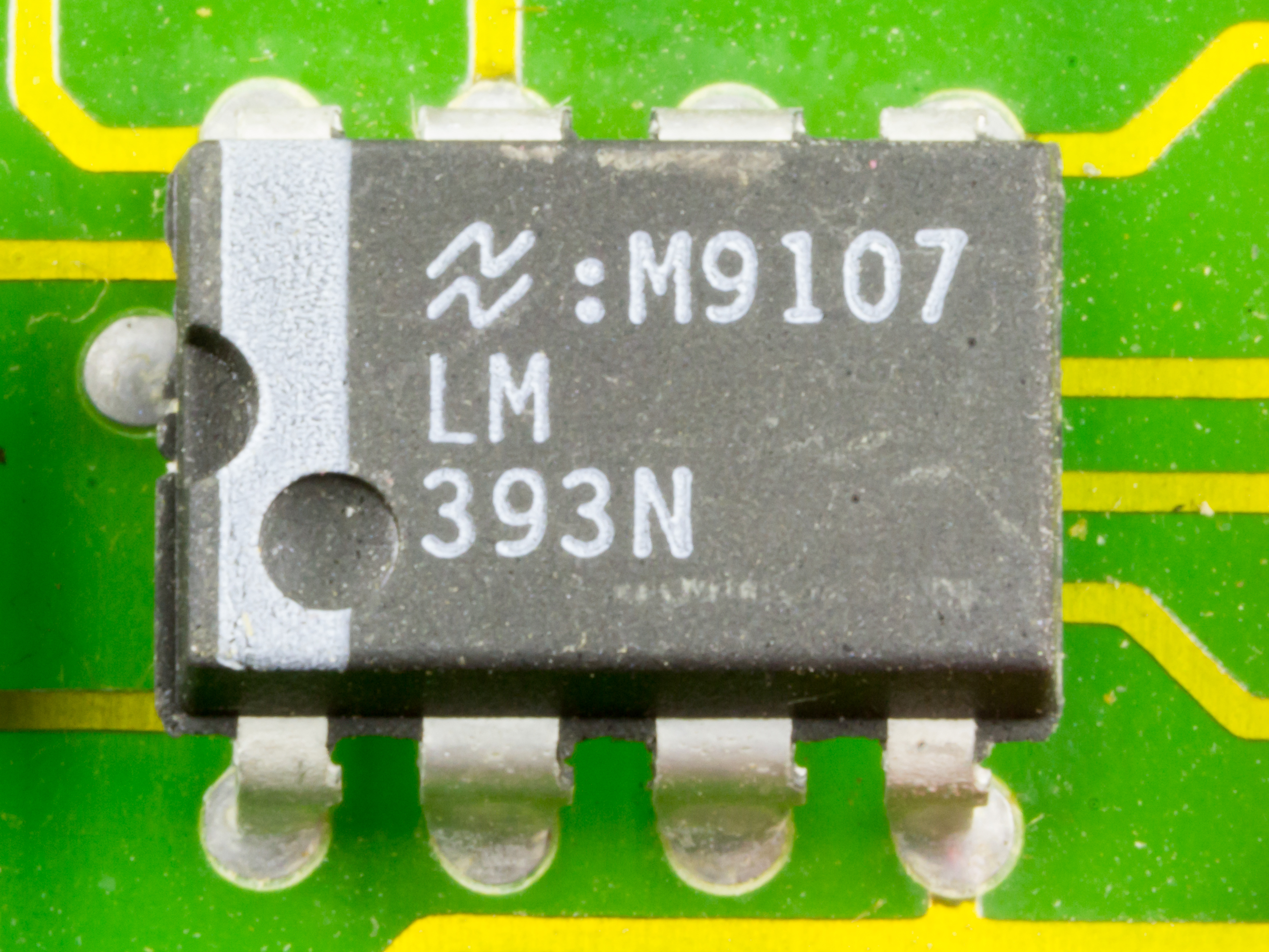
LM393 differential comparator manufactured by National Semiconductor

The following is a list of linear integrated circuits. Many were among the first analog integrated circuits commercially produced; some were groundbreaking innovations, and many are still being used.

Part number	Predecessor	Obsolete?	Description
555 timer IC		No	Timer, pulse generation, and oscillator applications.
78xx		No	Family of self-contained fixed linear voltage regulator integrated circuits.
Current conveyor			Electronic amplifier with unity gain. Three versions of generations of the idealised device, CCI, CCII and CCIII.
Low-dropout regulator (LDO)			DC linear voltage regulator that can regulate the output voltage even when the supply voltage is very close to the output voltage.
Hitachi HA12043		Yes	CX noise reduction system for phonograph records in the 1980s.
Hitachi HA12044		Yes	CX noise reduction system for phonograph records in the 1980s.
MK484			Fully functional AM radio detector on a chip. Constructed in a TO-92 case.
NE612			Oscillator and a mixer. Used in ham radio applications.
Operational amplifier			DC-coupled high-gain electronic voltage amplifier with a differential input and, usually, a single-ended output.
Telefunken U401B		Yes	High quality High Com analogue compander for audio in the 1970s.
Telefunken U401BG	Telefunken U401B	Yes	High quality High Com analogue compander for audio in the 1970s.
Telefunken U401BR	Telefunken U401BG	Yes	High quality High Com analogue compander for audio in the 1970s/1980s.
Telefunken U2141B		Yes	CX noise reduction system for phonograph records in the 1980s.
ZN414			Single-chip AM radio integrated circuit from 1972.
LM317			Adjustable 1.5 A positive voltage regulator (1.25 V-37 V)
LM13700			Two current controlled operational transconductance amplifiers (OTA), each having differential inputs and a push-pull output.
LM393		No	Dual Differential Comparator
LM358		No	Low power, wide supply range dual op-amps
LM386			Low voltage audio power amplifier
LM3875			High-performance 56 W audio power amplifier

== See also ==
- Linear integrated circuit
- List of LM-series integrated circuits
- 4000-series integrated circuits
- List of 4000-series integrated circuits
- 7400-series integrated circuits
- List of 7400-series integrated circuits
