= List of LM-series integrated circuits =

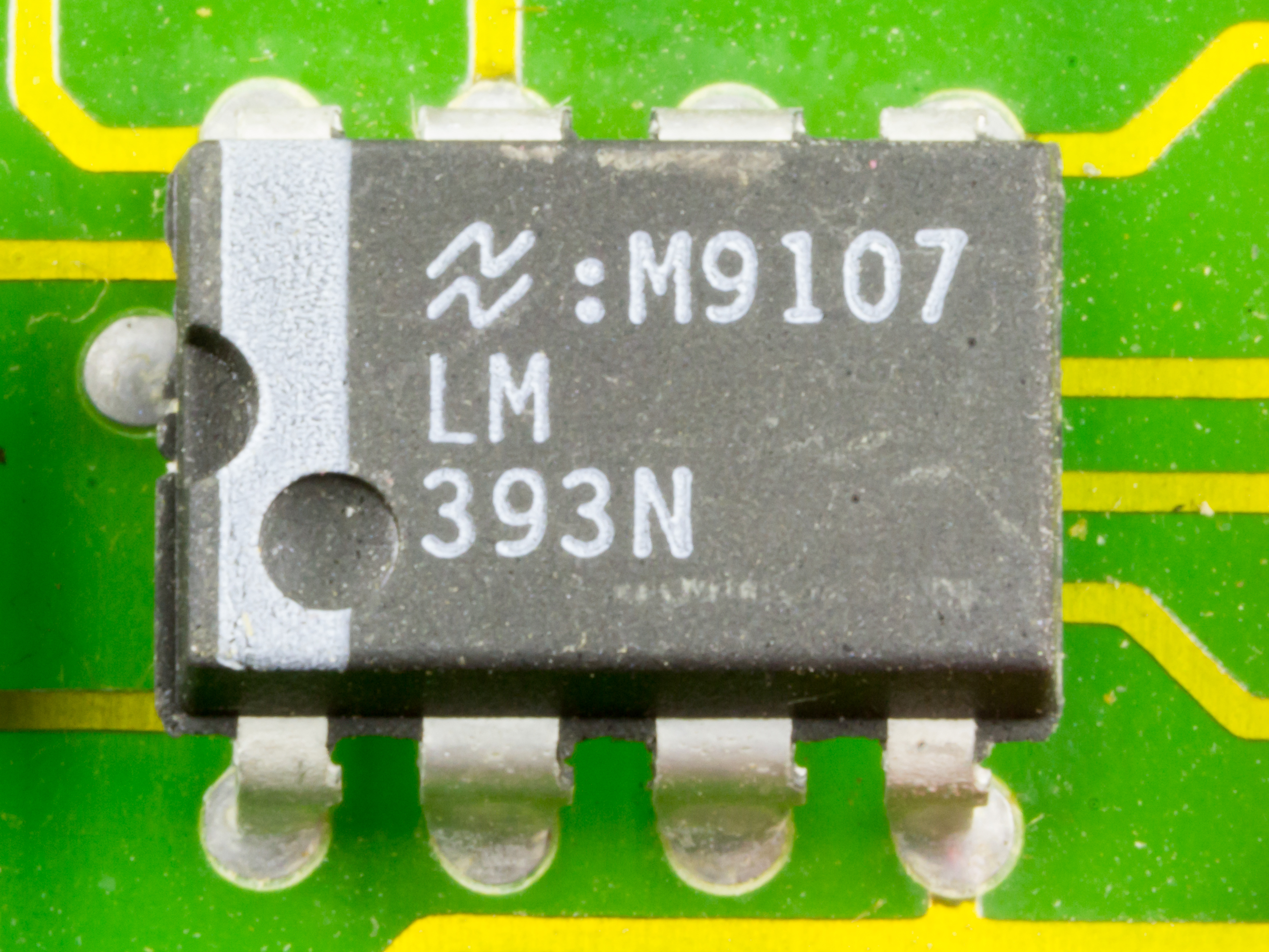
LM393 differential comparator manufactured by National Semiconductor

The following is a list of LM-series integrated circuits. Many were among the first analog integrated circuits commercially produced since late 1965; some were groundbreaking innovations. As of 2007, many are still being used. The LM series originated with integrated circuits made by National Semiconductor. The prefix LM stands for linear monolithic, referring to the analog components integrated onto a single piece of silicon. Because of the popularity of these parts, many of them were second-sourced by other manufacturers who kept the sequence number as an aid to identification of compatible parts. Several generations of pin-compatible descendants of the original parts have since become de facto standard electronic components.

== Operational amplifiers ==
Part number	Predecessor	Obsolete?	Description
LM10			Op-amp with an adjustable voltage reference
LM12		Yes	High-power op-amp
LM101; LM201; LM301	μA709		General-purpose op-amp with external compensation
LM107; LM207; LM307	μA709	Yes	General-purpose op-amp
LM108; LM208; LM308		Yes	Precision op-amp
LM112; LM212; LM312		Yes	Micropower op-amp with external compensation
LM118; LM218; LM318			Precision, fast general-purpose op-amp with external compensation
LM321			Low-power op-amp
LM124; LM224; LM324; LM2902			Quadruple wide-supply-range op-amps
LM143; LM343		Yes	High-voltage operational amplifier
LM144; LM344		Yes	High-voltage, high-slew-rate operational amplifier
LM146; LM346		only LM146	Programmable quadruple op-amps
LM148; LM248; LM348			General-purpose quadruple op-amps
LM158; LM258; LM358; LM2904			Low-power, wide-supply-range dual op-amps
LM392			Low-power dual op-amps and comparator
LM432	LM358, LMV431		Dual op-amps with fixed 2.5 V reference
LM611			Op-amp with an adjustable voltage reference
LM614			Quadruple op-amps with an adjustable voltage reference
LM675			Power op-amp with a maximal current output of 3 amperes
LM709		Yes	General-purpose op-amp
LM741	LM709		General-purpose op-amp. Widely used.
LM747		Yes	General-purpose dual op-amp.
LM748			General-purpose op-amp with external compensation
LM833			Dual high-speed audio operational amplifiers
LM837			Low-noise quadruple op-amps

== Differential comparators ==
Part number	Predecessor	Obsolete?	Description
LM306			High speed differential comparator with strobes
LM111; LM211; LM311	LM106; LM710		High speed differential comparator with strobes
LM119; LM219; LM319	LM711(?)		High speed dual comparators
LM139; LM239; LM339; LM2901			Quadruple wide supply range comparators
LM160; LM360	μA760		High speed comparator with complementary TTL outputs
LM161; LM361		only LM161	High speed comparator with strobed complementary TTL outputs
LM193; LM293; LM393; LM2903			Dual wide supply range comparators
LM397			General purpose comparator with an input common mode that includes ground
LM613			Dual op-amps, dual comparators and adjustable reference

== Current-mode (Norton) amplifiers ==
Part number	Predecessor	Obsolete?	Description
LM359			Dual, high speed, programmable current mode (Norton) amplifiers
LM2900; LM3900			Quad, current mode (Norton) amplifiers. Rail to Rail output.

== Instrumentation amplifiers ==
Part number	Predecessor	Obsolete?	Description
LM363		Yes	Precision instrumentation amplifier

== Audio amplifiers ==
Part number	Predecessor	Obsolete?	Description
LM377		Yes	Dual 2 W audio power amplifier
LM378		Yes	Dual 4 W audio power amplifier
LM379		Yes	Dual 6 W audio power amplifier
LM380			2.5 W audio power amplifier (fixed 34 dB gain)
LM383/LM2002		Yes	8 W audio power amplifier
LM384			5 W audio power amplifier (fixed 34 dB gain)
LM1875			20 W audio power amplifier (up to 90 dB gain)
LM1876			Dual 20 W audio power amplifier with Mute and Standby Modes (up to 90 dB gain)
LM386			Low voltage audio power amplifier
LM389		Yes	Low voltage audio power amplifier (same as LM386) with 3 NPN transistors
LM3875		Yes	High-performance 56 W audio power amplifier
LM3886			High-performance 68 W audio power amplifier

== Precision reference ==
Part number	Predecessor	Obsolete?	Description
LM113; LM313		only LM313	Temperature compensated Zener reference diode, 1.22 V breakdown voltage
LM329			Temperature compensated Zener reference diode, 6.9 V breakdown voltage
LM136; LM236; LM336			2.5 V or 5 V Zener reference diode with temperature coefficient trimmer
LM368		Yes	2.5 V precision voltage reference
LM169; LM369	LM199	Yes	2.5 V temperature compensated precision voltage reference
LM185; LM285; LM385			Fixed (1.2 V, 2.5 V) or adjustable micropower voltage reference
LM129; LM329		LM129	Fixed (6.95 V) buried zener voltage reference.
LM199; LM299; LM399		LM199 & LM299	Fixed (6.95 V) voltage reference, with built in heater (oven controlled version of LM329).
LM431			Adjustable precision Zener shunt regulator (2.5 V-36 V)

== Voltage regulators ==
Part number	Predecessor	Obsolete?	Description
LM105; LM305	LM100		Adjustable positive voltage regulator (4.5 V-40 V)
LM109; LM309			5-volt regulator (up to 1 A)
LM117; LM317			Adjustable 1.5 A positive voltage regulator (1.25 V-37 V)
LM120; LM320			Fixed 1.5 A negative voltage regulator (-5 V, -12 V, -15 V)
LM123; LM323			Fixed 3 A, 5-volt positive voltage regulator
LM325		Yes	Dual ±15-volt voltage regulator
LM330			5-volt positive voltage regulator, 0.6 V input-output difference
LM333		Yes	Adjustable 3 A negative voltage regulator (-1.2 V to -32 V)
LM137; LM237; LM337			Adjustable 1.5 A negative voltage regulator (-1.2 V to -37 V)
LM138; LM338			Adjustable 5 A voltage regulator (1.2 V-32 V)
LM196; LM396			Adjustable 10 A voltage regulator (1.2 V-32 V) National Semiconductor (Obsolete NLA but datasheet available).
LM140; LM340	LM78xx		1 A positive voltage regulator (5 V, 12 V, 15 V), can be adjustable
LM341; LM78Mxx			0.5 A protected positive voltage regulators (5 V, 12 V, 15 V)
LM145; LM345		Yes	Fixed 3 A, -5-volt negative voltage regulator
LM150; LM350		only LM150	Adjustable 3 A, positive voltage regulator (1.2 V-33 V)
LM723			Low power variable voltage regulator
LM78xx			Fixed 1 A positive voltage regulators (5 V-24 V)
LM79xx			Fixed 1.5 A negative voltage regulators (-5 V, -12 V, -15 V)
LM2576			Fixed and adjustable 3 A buck/buck-boost switching regulators. output range (1.23v to 37v).
LM1524; LM2524; LM3524			Regulating pulse width modulator.
LM2596			Fixed and adjustable 3 A buck switching regulators. f=150 kHz.
LM2679			Fixed and adjustable 5 A buck switching regulators. f=260 kHz.
LM61430-q1			3-V to 36-V, 3-A, Low-EMI Synchronous Step-Down Converter. f=0.2-2 MHz.
LM3281			3V to 5V, 1-A, DC-DC Step-Down Converter. 3.3V-OUT(fixed) f=6 MHz. 94% efficiency at 300mA load

== Voltage-to-frequency converters ==
Part number	Predecessor	Obsolete?	Description
LM231; LM331			Precision voltage-to-frequency converter (1 Hz-100 kHz)

== Current sources ==
Part number	Predecessor	Obsolete?	Description
LM134; LM234; LM334			Adjustable current source (1 μA-10 mA)

== Temperature sensors and thermostats ==
Part number	Predecessor	Obsolete?	Description
LM19		No	Temperature sensor, 2.5 °C accuracy
LM20		No	Temperature sensor, 1.5 °C accuracy
LM26		No	Factory preset thermostat, 3 °C accuracy
LM27		No	Factory preset thermostat (120 °C-150 °C), 3 °C accuracy
LM34		No	Precision Fahrenheit temperature sensor, 0.5 °F accuracy
LM35		No	Precision Celsius temperature sensor, 0.25 °C accuracy
LM45		No	Precision Celsius temperature sensor, 2 °C accuracy
LM50		No	Single supply Celsius temperature sensor, 2 °C accuracy
LM56		No	Dual output resistor programmable thermostat with analog temperature sensor
LM60; LM61; LM62		No	Single supply Celsius temperature sensors (The difference between the components is the voltage scale)
LM75A		No	Digital temperature sensor and programmable thermostat.
LM135; LM235; LM335		No	Precision Zener temperature sensor, 1 °C accuracy

== Others ==
Part number	Predecessor	Obsolete?	Description
LM102; LM202; LM302		Yes	Voltage Followers
LM110; LM210; LM310		Yes	Voltage Followers
LM194; LM394		Yes	Supermatched NPN Transistor Pair
LM566		Yes	Voltage Controlled Oscillator (VCO)
LM567		No	Tone decoder
LM3909			LED Flasher/Oscillator
LM3914			Bargraph display driver (linear steps)
LM3915			Bargraph display driver (logarithmic steps)
LM3916		Yes	Bargraph display driver (VU-meter steps)
LM13600		Yes	Operational Transconductance Amplifier (OTA)
LM13700			Operational Transconductance Amplifier (OTA)

== See also ==
- Linear integrated circuit, List of linear integrated circuits
- 4000-series integrated circuits, List of 4000-series integrated circuits
- 7400-series integrated circuits, List of 7400-series integrated circuits
- Pin compatibility

== Notes ==
- Suffixes that denote specific versions of the part (e.g. LM305 vs. LM305A) are not shown in this list.
- Obsolete 4-bit microprocessors of the LM6400 family, manufactured by Sanyo, have no relationship to the analog LM series and are not included in this list.
- The first digit of each part denote different temperature ranges. Mostly, LM1xx indicates military-grade temperature range of -55 °C to +125 °C, LM2xx indicates industrial-grade temperature range of -25 °C to +85 °C and LM3xx indicates commercial temperature range of 0 °C to 70 °C.
- Some obsolete parts continue to be manufactured by different companies other than the original manufacturer.
