= Supply voltage supervisor =

Circuit that detects under voltage conditions

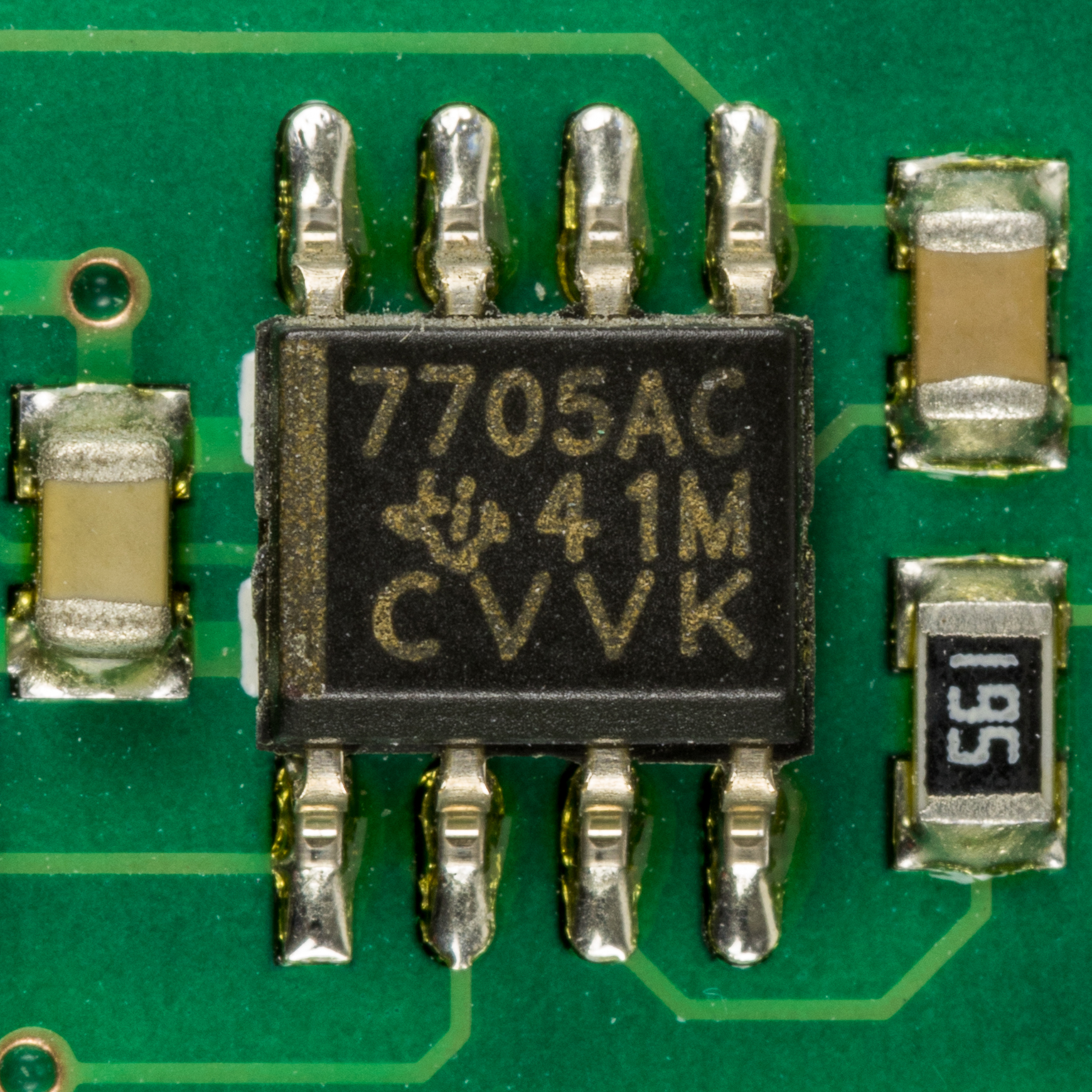
Texas Instruments 7705AC

Supply voltage supervisor (SVS, or supply voltage supervisory circuit) circuits are used to monitor the supply voltage to embedded and electronic systems for under voltage conditions. If an under voltage condition is detected then the supervisory circuit will reset the controller and keep it in that state as long as the under voltage condition persists. This type of reset is called brown out reset (BOR). In many modern day microcontrollers, brown out reset protection is used to prevent erratic behavior or damage due to unstable supply voltages.

== Application ==
Supply voltage supervisors are used to protect circuitry such as MPUs, DRAM, and other devices that are easily damaged by high voltages or will operate incorrectly at low voltages. They can be specialized ICs, but are often found integrated into a microcontroller on the same chip.

Features and functions that can be included with voltage supervisors are:

- Watchdog timer
- Battery switch-over (UPS)
- Window comparator circuit (window detector)
