= LM3914 =

Analog integrated circuit

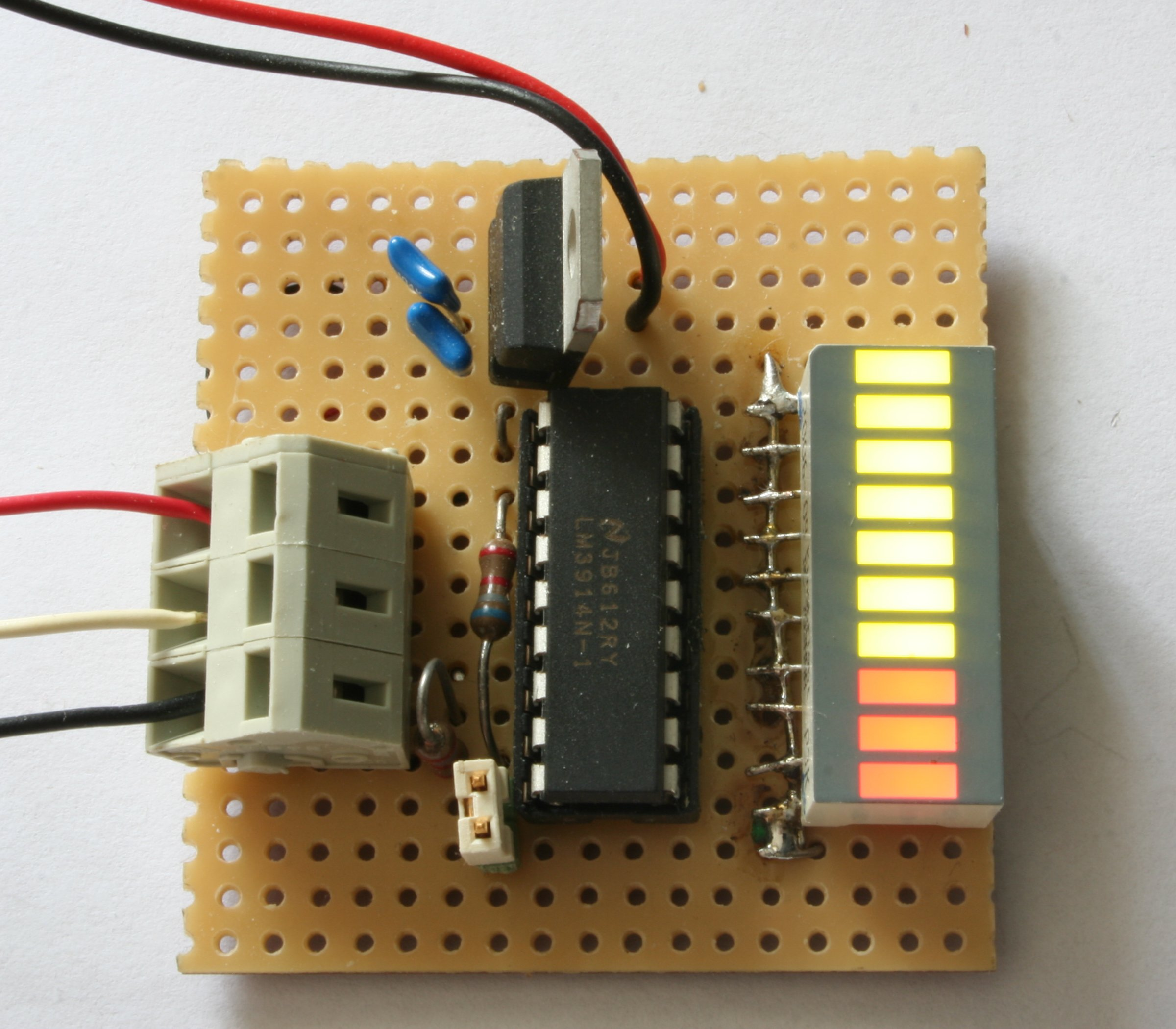
LM3914 driving an LED bargraph display

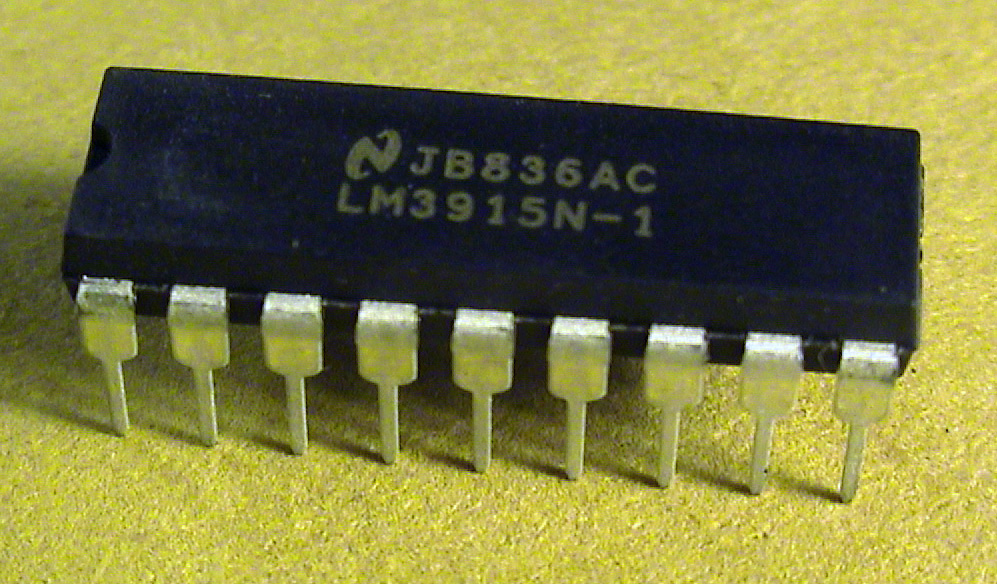
LM3915 IC in DIP-18 package

The LM3914 is an integrated circuit (IC), designed by National Semiconductor in the late 1970s, used to operate displays that visually show the magnitude of an analog signal. It can drive up to 10 LEDs, LCDs, or vacuum fluorescent displays on its outputs. The linear scaling of the output thresholds makes the device usable, for example, as a voltmeter. In the basic configuration it provides a ten step scale which is expandable to over 100 segments with other LM3914 ICs in series.

== Features ==
The LM3914 / LM3915 / LM3916 are identical except for the ten resistor divider inside each part.

- LM3914 – linear steps, scaled by a resistor divider consisting of ten 1000 ohm resistors.
- LM3915 – 3dB logarithmic steps, scaled by a resistor divider consisting of 6630, 4690, 3310, 2340, 1660, 1170, 830, 590, 410, 1000 ohm resistors.
- LM3916 – VU-meter steps, scaled by a resistor divider consisting of 1087, 970, 864, 769, 1298, 1031, 819, 923, 1531, 708 ohm resistors.

All the devices in this group operate with a range of voltages of 3–25 V, can drive LED and VFD displays. They can provide a regulated output current between 2-30 mA to directly drive displays.

Internally, each device contains ten comparators and a resistor scaling network, as well as a 1.25 volt reference source. As the input voltage increases, each comparator turns on. The device can be configured for either a bar-graph mode, where all lower-output terminals switch on, or "dot" mode in which only one output goes on. The device is packaged in an 18 pin dual in-line package or in a surface mount leadless chip carrier.

== See also ==
- List of LM-series integrated circuits
