= Albert Medwin =

American electrical engineer (1925–2020)

Albert H. Medwin (October 27, 1925 – October 26, 2020) was an American electrical engineer. He held several US patents, including ones in the field of electronic encoders. Medwin was involved in the early development of integrated circuits while working at RCA in Somerville, New Jersey. In the 1960s he led the engineering group that developed the world's first low power CMOS chips including a high speed shift register. He is also credited with leading the RCA group that introduced the 4000 series CMOS integrated circuit to the market.

Medwin was born in New York City, New York. He served in the United States Army during World War II. Medwin died on October 26, 2020, a day short of his 95th birthday.

== Technical Background ==
Medwin's first patent (US 3,390,314) was issued in 1968 when he was 43. It is entitled "Semiconductor Translating Circuit" and was assigned to Radio Corporation of America (RCA). His second patent (US 3,588,635) was issued in 1971 and is simply titled "Integrated Circuit." It was also assigned to the RCA Corporation. At this point, Medwin left RCA to start his own integrated circuit development company called Ragen Semiconductor. He received his next patent (US 3,789,388) in 1972, titled "Apparatus for Providing a Pulsed Liquid Crystal Display." This was the first of his patents that was assigned to Ragen Semiconductor.

A number of companies were competing in the early 1970s to develop and commercialize a pocket sized calculator. Medwin's activities in this space were chronicled in Business Week, Electronics and other periodicals.

Several years later, Medwin started another company call CGS Systems, Inc. in Princeton, New Jersey. His next patent (US 4,110,701) was issued in 1978 and is titled "Method and Apparatus for Near-Synchronization of a Pair of Oscillators, and Measuring Thereby." His final two patents are related to electronic encoders, "Electronic Measuring Apparatus" (US 4,367,438) issued in 1983 and "Electronic Vernier" (US 4,459,702) issued in 1984. Neither of these was assigned to a company.
