= MK484 =

AM radio detector on a chip

A drawing of the MK484

The MK484 AM radio IC is a fully functional AM radio detector on a chip. It is constructed in a TO-92 case, resembling a small transistor. It replaces the similar ZN414 AM radio IC from the 1970s. The MK484 is favored by many hobbyists. It is advantageous in that it performs well with minimal discrete components, and can run from a single 1.5-volt cell.

The MK484 has now in turn been replaced by the TA7642.

== Standard operation ==
The simplest circuit employing the MK484 can be constructed using only a battery, an earphone (or high-impedance speaker), a coil and a variable capacitor.

== Extended operation ==
The output of the MK484 can be fed into the base of a transistor to provide greater amplification as a class-A amplifier, however this is often an inefficient design. Conversely, the LM386 audio amplifier may be used to drive a small speaker.

Note that higher voltage is required if the LM386 is to be used. Therefore, small signal diodes (such as 1N4148) are recommended to create a voltage drop, or use a Zener DC–DC converter with a red LED (in forward, can double as a power indicator) and a resistor (several hundred ohms for 9V operation), to avoid overvolting the MK484.

== Advantages ==
- Compact size
- Low power consumption
- Low cost: Rs 40 to 60 in Indian electronic markets
- Retails from 65 cents each on various websites
