= Linear integrated circuit =

Set of analog electronic circuits on a single semiconductor

A linear integrated circuit or analog chip is a set of miniature electronic analog circuits formed on a single piece of semiconductor material.

== Description ==
The voltage and current at specified points in the circuits of analog chips vary continuously over time. In contrast, digital chips only assign meaning to voltages or currents at discrete levels. In addition to transistors, analog chips often include a larger number of passive elements (capacitors, resistors, and inductors) than digital chips. Inductors tend to be avoided because of their large physical size, and difficulties incorporating them into monolithic semiconductor ICs. Certain circuits such as gyrators can often act as equivalents of inductors, while constructed only from transistors and capacitors.

Analog chips may also contain digital logic elements to replace some analog functions, or to allow the chip to communicate with a microprocessor. For this reason, and since logic is commonly implemented using CMOS technology, these chips typically use BiCMOS processes, as implemented by companies such as Freescale, Texas Instruments, STMicroelectronics, and others. This is known as "mixed signal processing", and allows a designer to incorporate more functions into a single chip. Some of the benefits of this mixed technology include load protection, reduced parts count, and higher reliability.

Purely analog chips in information processing have been mostly replaced with digital chips. Analog chips are still required for wideband signals, high-power applications, and transducer interfaces. Research and industry in this specialty continues to grow and prosper. Some examples of long-lived and well-known analog chips are the 741 operational amplifier, and the 555 timer IC.

Power supply chips are also considered to be analog chips. Their main purpose is to produce a well-regulated output voltage supply for other chips in the system. Since all electronic systems require electrical power, power supply ICs (power management integrated circuits, PMIC) are important elements of those systems.

Important basic building blocks of analog chip design include:

- current source
- current mirror
- differential amplifier
- voltage reference, bandgap voltage reference

All the above circuit building blocks can be implemented using bipolar technology as well as metal-oxide-silicon (MOS) technology. MOS band gap references use lateral bipolar transistors for their functioning.

People who have specialized in this field include Bob Widlar, Bob Pease, Hans Camenzind, George Erdi, Jim Williams, and Barrie Gilbert, among others.

== See also ==
- List of linear integrated circuits
- List of LM-series integrated circuits
- 4000-series integrated circuits
- List of 4000-series integrated circuits
- 7400-series integrated circuits
- List of 7400-series integrated circuits
