= Supervisory circuit =

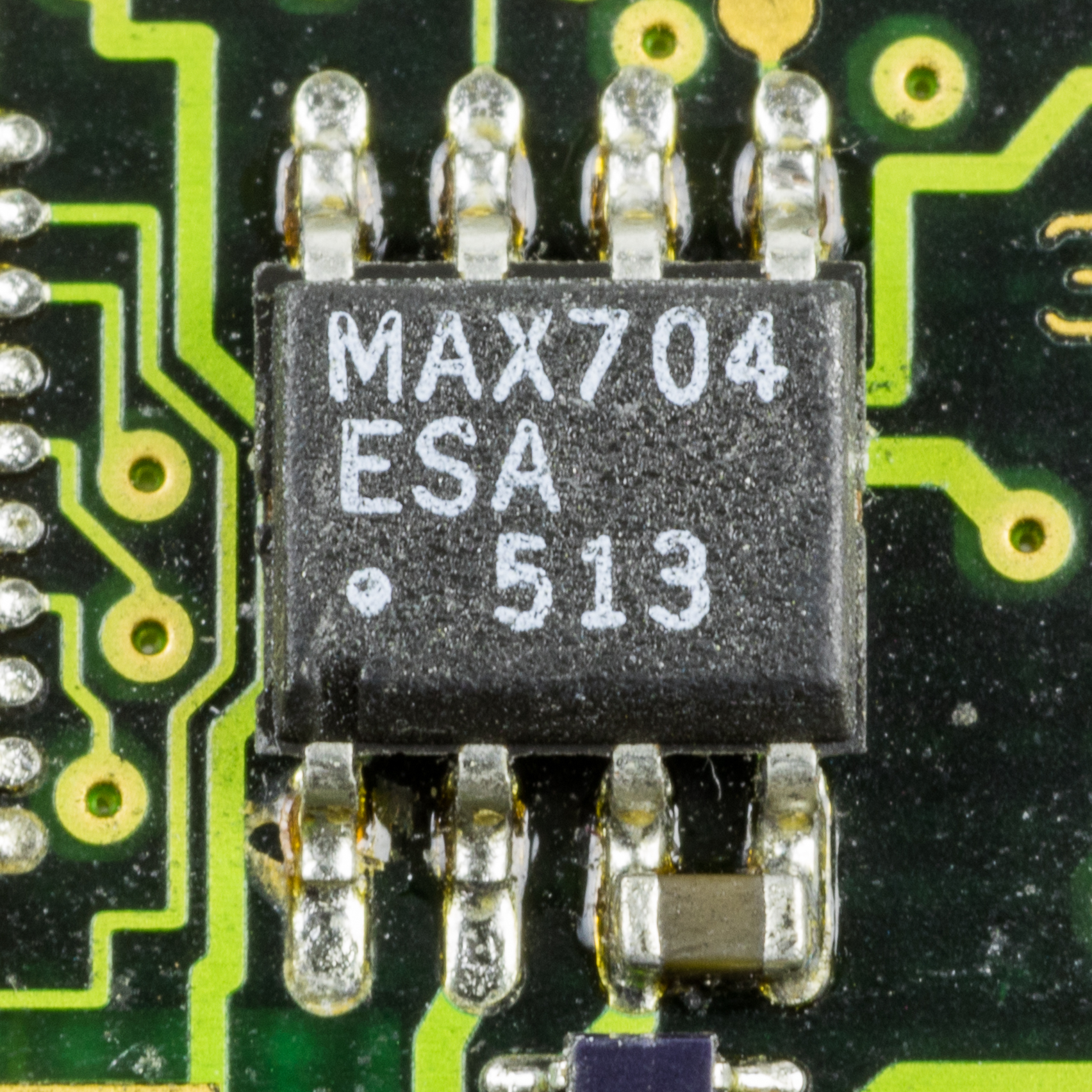
Maxim MAX704: Microprocessor Supervisory Circuit with Battery Backup

Supervisory circuits are electronic circuits that monitor one or more parameters of systems such as power supplies and microprocessors which must be maintained within certain limits, and take appropriate action if a parameter goes out of bounds, creating an unacceptable or dangerous situation.

Supervisory circuits are known by a variety of names, including battery monitors, power supply monitors, supply supervisory circuits, and reset circuits.

== Thermal protection ==
A thermal protection circuit consists of a temperature-monitoring circuit and a control circuit. The control circuit may either shut down the circuitry it is protecting, reduce the power available in order to avoid overheating, or notify the system (software or user). These circuits may be quite complex, programmable and software-run, or simple with predefined limits.

== Overvoltage and undervoltage protection ==
Voltage protection circuits protect circuitry from either overvoltage or undervoltage; either of these situations can have detrimental effects. Supervisory circuits that specifically focus on voltage regulation are often sold as supply voltage supervisors and will reset the protected circuit when the voltage returns to operating range.

Two types of overvoltage protection devices are currently used: clamping, which passes through voltages up to a certain level, and foldback, which shunts voltage away from the load. The shunting creates a short circuit which removes power from the protected circuitry. In certain applications this circuitry can reset itself after the dangerous condition has passed.

== Fire Alarm Systems ==
Fire Alarm systems often supervise inputs and outputs with an end-of-line device such as a resistor or capacitor. The system looks for changes in resistance or capacitance values to determine if the circuit has an abnormal condition.

== See also ==
- From the Littelfuse Electronics Designer guide. PDF contains a good introduction to circuit protection.
