= Window detector =

window detector circuit diagram

A window detector circuit, also called window comparator circuit or dual edge limit detector circuits is used to determine whether an unknown input is between two precise reference threshold voltages. It employs two comparators to detect over-voltage or under-voltage.

Each single comparator detects the common input voltage against one of two reference voltages, normally upper and lower limits. Outputs behind a logic gate like AND detect the input as in range of the so-called "window" between upper and lower reference.

Window detectors are used in industrial alarms, level sensor and controls, digital computers and production-line testing.

== Function ==
Truth table
Uin	A	B	Y
> Urefbot	0	1	0
< Ureftop	1	0	0
< Ureftop > Urefbot	1	1	1

If U_{in} is greater than U_{refbot} and U_{in} is lower than U_{reftop} then both comparators' outputs will swing to the logical high and turn on the AND gate output.

== See also ==
- Comparator
- Operational amplifier
- 555 timer IC
