= LM13700 =

Dual operational transconductance amplifier

Schematic symbol for an OTA has inverting (V_{in-}) and noninverting (V_{in+}) inputs, power supply lines (V_{+} and V_{−}), two biasing inputs (I_{abc} and I_{bias}), and a single output current I_{out}.

The LM13700 is an integrated circuit (IC) containing two current-controlled operational transconductance amplifiers (OTA), each having differential inputs and a push-pull output. Linearizing diodes at the input can optionally be used by applying a bias current into I_{bias} to reduce distortion and allow increased input levels. The output bias can be programmed using an optional current into the I_{abc} pin. Two unconnected Darlington emitter follower output buffers capable of 20 mA each can be optionally connected to each OTA's output to complement the OTA's wide dynamic range. The bias currents (and hence the output DC levels) of the Darlington output buffers on the LM13700 are independent of the I_{abc} pin (unlike those on the LM13600). This may result in performance superior to that of the LM13600 in audio applications. This chip historically has been useful in audio electronics, especially in analog synthesizer circuits like voltage-controlled oscillators, voltage-controlled filters, and voltage-controlled amplifiers.

== Distinction from op-amp ==
While both an OTA and an op-amp have a pair of differential voltage inputs and a single output, an OTA outputs a current rather than a voltage.

== See also ==
- Transconductance
- Operational amplifier
- Transconductance amplifier
- Current mirror
