= LM386 =

Integrated circuit with audio amplifier

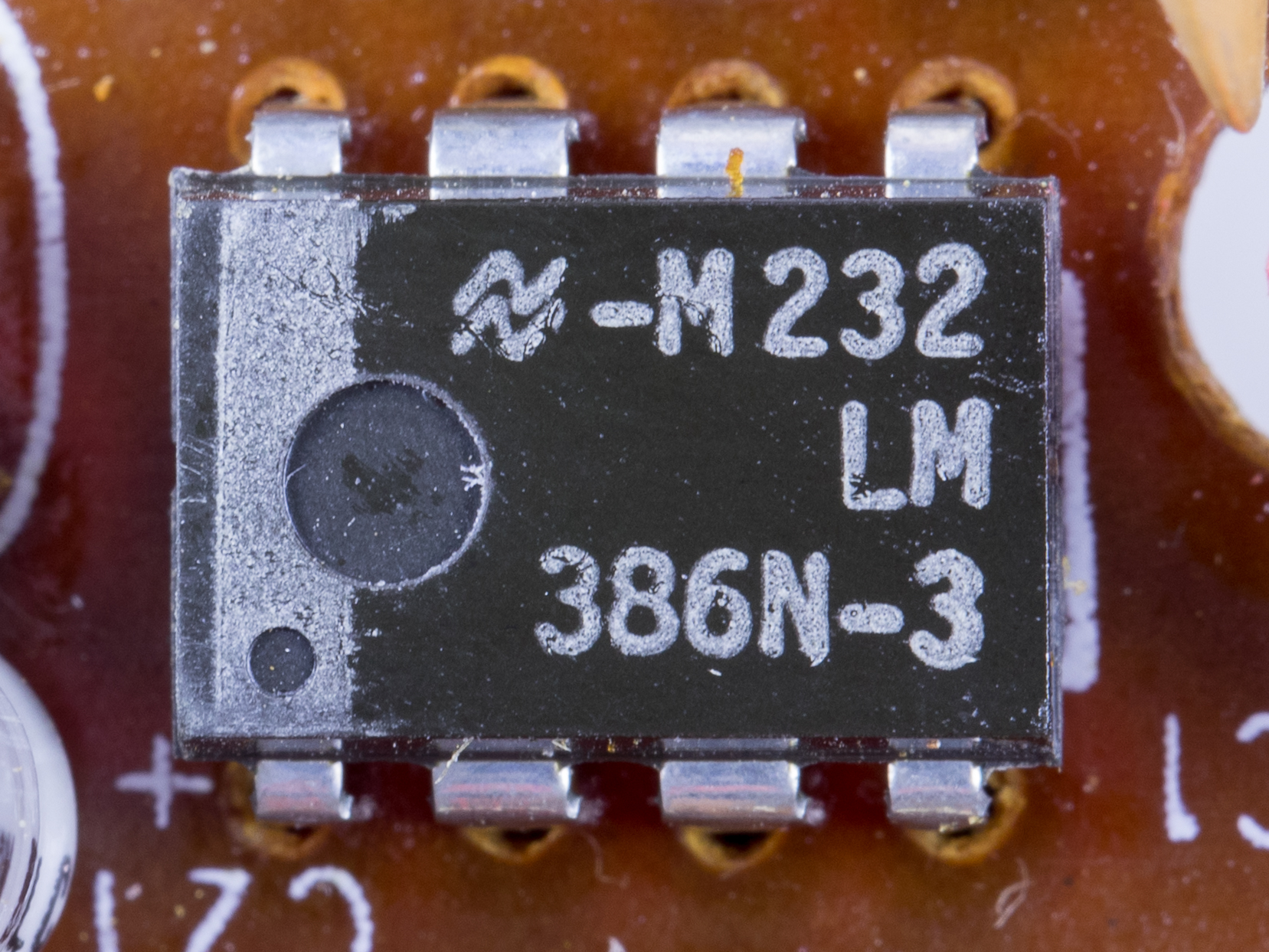
LM386 in DIP-8 package

The LM386 is an integrated circuit containing a low-voltage audio power amplifier. It is suitable for battery-powered devices such as radios, guitar amplifiers, and hobby electronics projects. The IC consists of an 8-pin dual in-line package (DIP-8) and can output 0.25 to 1 watts of power, depending on the model, using a 9-volt power supply.

== Part numbers ==
There are three different models of the LM386 that have slightly different specifications, outlined below.

Part number	Supply voltage, V		Min Speaker impedance, Ω	Output power, mW	
Part number	Min.	Max.	Min Speaker impedance, Ω	Min.	Typical
LM386N-1	4	12	4	250	325 @ Vs=6V, Rl=8Ω
LM386N-3	4	12	4	500	700 @ Vs=9V, Rl=8Ω
LM386N-4	5	18	4	700	1000 @ Vs=16V, Rl=32Ω

Almost identical versions of the device are available from Unisonic (Unisonic Technologies Co. or UTC) as the LM386 and the New Japan Radio Co. Ltd. (JRC) as the NJM386 and NJM386B.

The JRC devices are also available in a single-in-line package.

JRC devices, marked as 386 JRC, are sometimes misleadingly referred to as the JRC386.

== SPICE simulation models ==
Although National Semiconductor and Texas Instruments (who bought National Semiconductor in 2011) do not provide an official SPICE model for the LM386, there are two independently developed models freely available:

- The original "No-Frills LM386 Model" by Dave Dilatush.
- An improved model, "The EasyEDA LM386EE spice model" developed for the simulations of the "Tesseract Guitar Practice Amplifier" project.

== Usage in guitar amplifiers ==
- The LM386 is one of the most common amps used in DIY guitar preamplifiers and sustainers due to its ability to run on a single 9V battery.
- The well-known "Smokey Amp" created by Bruce Zinky uses an LM386 and is notable for being able to fit in a cigarette package.
- The "Little Gem" and "Little Gem MkII" are modified/cloned versions of the "Smokey Amp".
- The "Ruby" amp is a modified version of a Little Gem amplifier.

== Usage in amateur radio ==
The LM386 is very commonly used in the audio amplifier of low power QRP amateur radio rigs such as the Pixie.

== See also ==
- List of LM-series integrated circuits
