= LM358 =

Low power dual operational amplifier

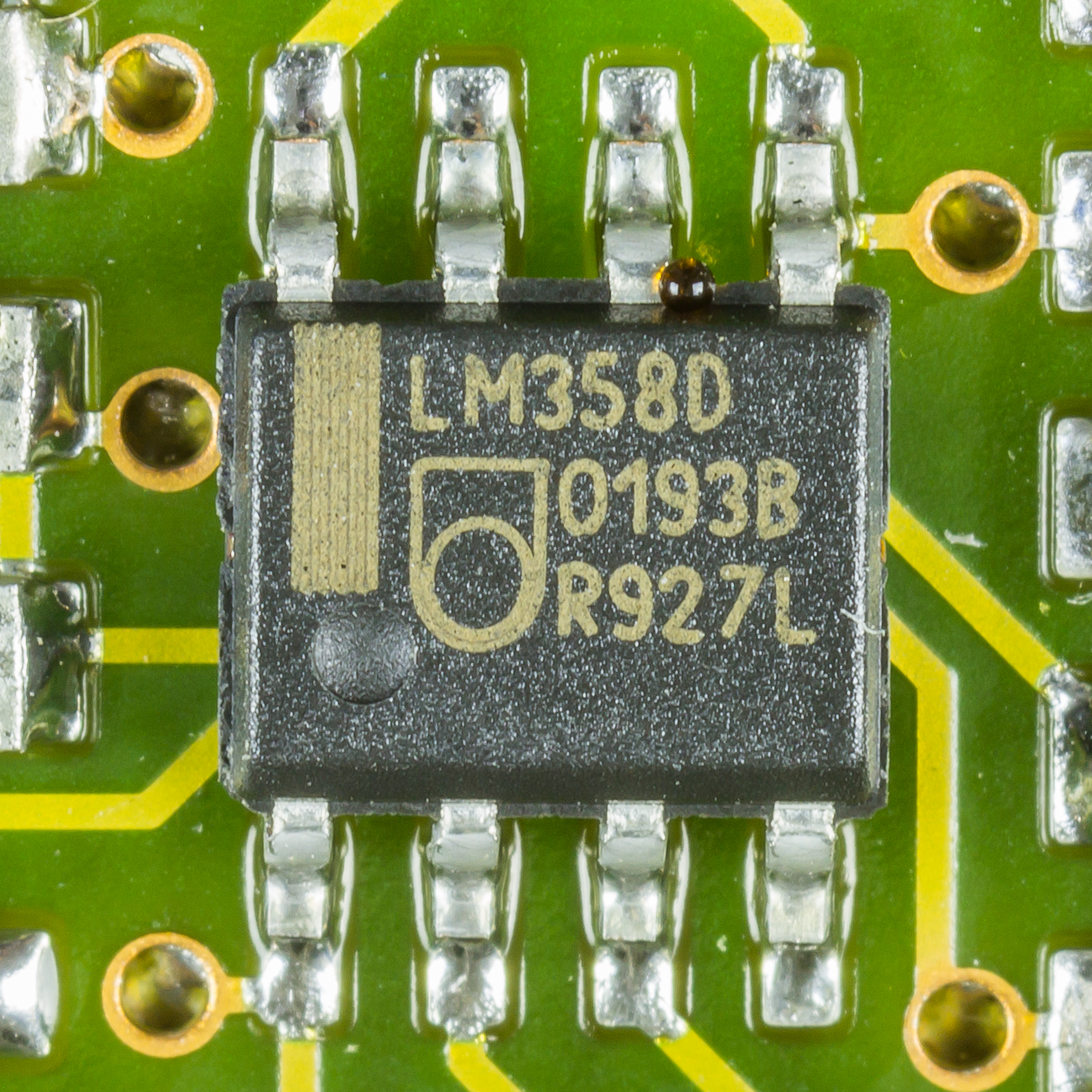
Philips LM358D

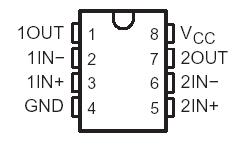
LM358 pinout

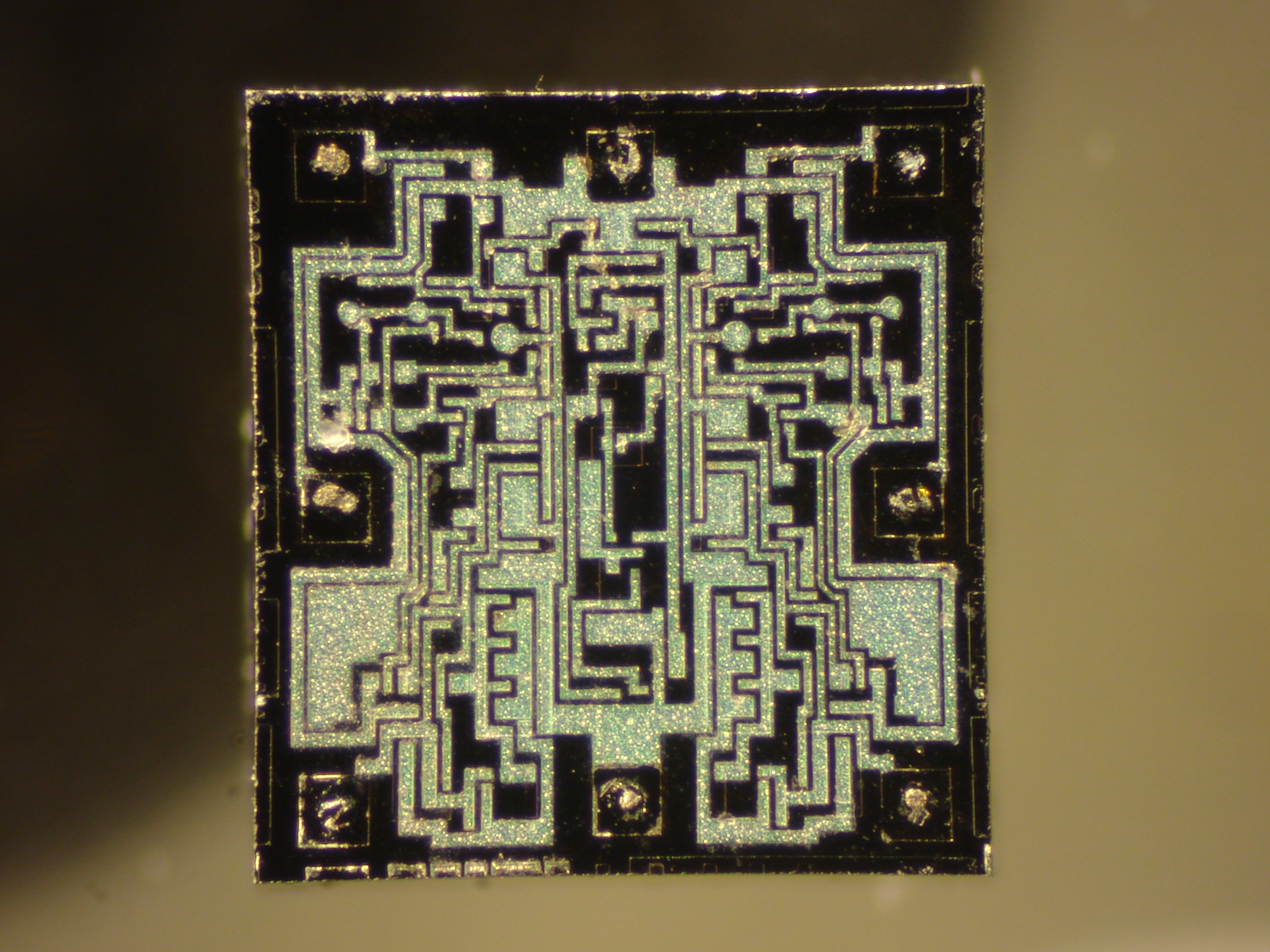
LM358 die photo

The LM358 is a low-power dual operational amplifier integrated circuit, originally introduced by National Semiconductor.

It uses a single power supply from +3 to +30 volts for V_{CC} (though some variants go higher, such as 36 volts for the LM358B).

Input voltage can range from −0.3 volts to V_{CC}. Small negative input voltages below ground (GND) are acceptable because the bipolar junction transistors at the input stage are configured such that their base-emitter junction voltage provides just enough voltage differential between the collector and base for the transistors to function.

== History ==
After the development of the μA741 and its dual and quad derivatives, National Semiconductor's Russell and Frederiksen developed an amplifier design suitable for low-voltage single supply packages, hinging on an input stage g^{m} reduction technique due to James Solomon. This was developed into the LM324, which quickly became the industry standard quad op-amp. The LM358 followed shortly, a similar dual design, joining a group of low cost, decades old industry standards.
