= Fast diode =

A fast diode is a faster-than-standard current rectifier. The terms "fast" and "ultrafast" are in comparison to standard rectifiers designed for low-frequency applications such as rectifying sinusoidal current supplied from the AC mains. A “fast” rectifier typically recovers ten times faster than a standard rectifier, and an “ultrafast” designation is usually applied to rectifiers designed to beat the standard rectifier recovery by being more than fifty times faster.

Categorization as "ultrafast", "fast", or "soft" is in reference to the diode's reverse recovery characteristics. "Fast" and "ultrafast" rectifiers are so termed because they cease conducting current in the reverse direction much more quickly than standard rectifiers. "Soft" is a term applied to a subset of ultrafast rectifiers that recover to the non-conducting state quickly, but in a non-abrupt manner.

Diode part numbers
Voltage	Through-hole axial package					Surface-mount package			
Voltage	1 A (DO-41)	1.5 A (DO-15)	3 A (DO-201AD)	6 A (R-6)	10 A (R-6)	1 A (SMA)	2 A (SMB)	3 A (SMC)	5 A (SMC)
50 V	UF4001		UF5400			US1A			
100 V	UF4002		UF5401			US1B			
200 V	UF4003		UF5402			US1D			
400 V	UF4004		UF5404			US1G			
600 V	UF4005		UF5406			US1J			
800 V	UF4006		UF5407			US1K			
1000 V	UF4007		UF5408			US1M			
Datasheet									

== See also ==
- Diode
- 1N400x general-purpose diodes
