= SS12 =

SS12 may refer to:

- SS.12, a French surface-to-surface missile
- SS-12 Scaleboard, a Soviet mobile theatre ballistic missile
- USS B-3 (SS-12), a submarine of the United States Navy
- SS12, a schottky diode electrical component
- Strada statale 12 dell'Abetone e del Brennero, a state road in Northern Italy, connecting to Austria
