= Varicap =

Type of diode

Varicap diode
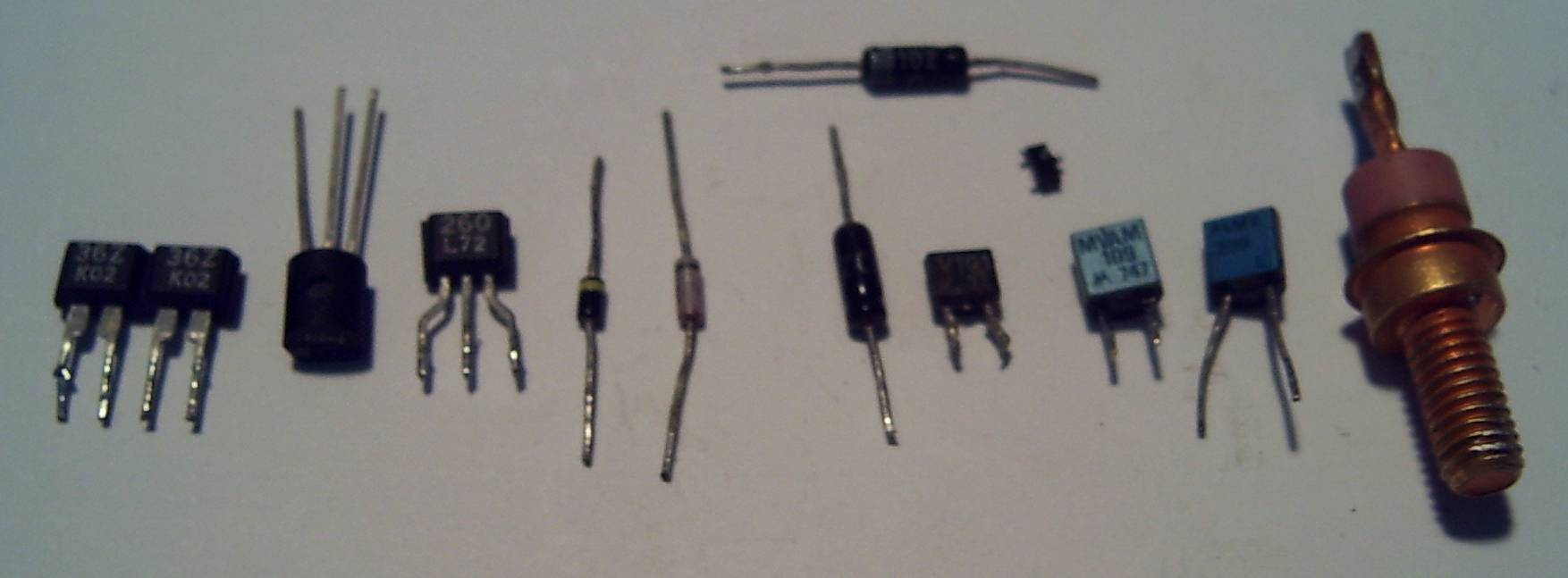
- Component type: Passive
- Invention year: 1961
- First produced: 1967
- First produced by: TRW Inc.
- Pin names: Anode and cathode

Electronic symbol

A varicap diode, varactor diode, variable capacitance diode, variable reactance diode or tuning diode is a type of diode designed to exploit the voltage-dependent capacitance of a reverse-biased p–n junction.

== Applications ==
Varactors are used as voltage-controlled capacitors. They are commonly used in voltage-controlled oscillators, parametric amplifiers, and frequency multipliers. Voltage-controlled oscillators have many applications such as frequency modulation for FM transmitters and phase-locked loops. Phase-locked loops are used for the frequency synthesizers that tune many radios, television sets, and cellular telephones.

The varicap was developed by the Pacific Semiconductor subsidiary of the Ramo Wooldridge Corporation who received a patent for the device in June 1961. The device name was also trademarked as the "Varicap" by TRW Semiconductors, the successor to Pacific Semiconductors, in October 1967. This helps explain the different names for the device as it came into use.

== Operation ==
Operation of a varicap. Holes are blue, electrons are red, depletion zone is white. The electrodes are at the top and bottom.

Varactors are operated in a reverse-biased state, so no DC current flows through the device. The amount of reverse bias controls the thickness of the depletion zone and therefore the varactor's junction capacitance. Capacitance change characteristic depends on doping profile. Generally, for abrupt junction profile, the depletion region thickness is proportional to the square root of the applied voltage, and capacitance is inversely proportional to the depletion region thickness. Thus, the capacitance is inversely proportional to the square root of applied voltage. For hyperabrupt junction profile capacitance change is more non-linear, but hyperabrupt varicaps have larger capacitance variation and can work with lower voltages.

All diodes exhibit this variable junction capacitance, but varactors are manufactured to exploit the effect and increase the capacitance variation.

The figure shows an example of a cross section of a varactor with the depletion layer formed of a p–n junction. This depletion layer can also be made of a MOS or a Schottky diode. This is important in CMOS and MMIC technology.

== Use in a circuit ==
=== Tuning circuits ===
Generally the use of a varicap diode in a circuit requires connecting it to a tuned circuit, usually in parallel with any existing capacitance or inductance. A DC voltage is applied as reverse bias across the varicap to alter its capacitance. The DC bias voltage must be blocked from entering the tuned circuit. This can be accomplished by placing a DC blocking capacitor with a capacitance about 100 times greater than the maximum capacitance of the varicap diode in series with it and by applying DC from a high impedance source to the node between the varicap cathode and the blocking capacitor as shown in the upper left circuit in the accompanying diagram.

Example circuits using varicaps

Since no significant DC current flows in the varicap, the value of the resistor connecting its cathode back to the DC control voltage resistor can be somewhere in the range of 22 kΩ to 150 kΩ and the blocking capacitor somewhere in the range of 5–100 nF. Sometimes, with very high-Q tuned circuits, an inductor is placed in series with the resistor to increase the source impedance of the control voltage so as not to load the tuned circuit and decrease its Q.

Another common configuration uses two back-to-back (anode to anode) varicap diodes. (See lower left circuit in diagram.) The second varicap effectively replaces the blocking capacitor in the first circuit. This reduces the overall capacitance and the capacitance range by half, but has the advantage of reducing the AC component of voltage across each device and has symmetrical distortion should the AC component possess enough amplitude to bias the varicaps into forward conduction.

When designing tuning circuits with varicaps it is usually good practice to maintain the AC component of voltage across the varicap at a minimal level, usually less than 100 mV peak to peak, to prevent changing the diode capacitance too much, which would distort the signal and add harmonics.

A third circuit, at top right in diagram, uses two series-connected varicaps and separate DC and AC signal ground connections. The DC ground is shown as a traditional ground symbol, and the AC ground as an open triangle. Separation of grounds is often done to (i) prevent high-frequency radiation from the low-frequency ground node, and (ii) prevent DC currents in the AC ground node changing bias and operating points of active devices such as varicaps and transistors.

These circuit configurations are quite common in television tuners and electronically tuned broadcast AM and FM receivers, as well as other communications equipment and industrial equipment. Early varicap diodes usually required a reverse voltage range of 0–33 V to obtain their full capacitance ranges, which were still quite small, approximately 1–10 pF. These types were – and still are – extensively used in television tuners, whose high carrier frequencies require only small changes in capacitance.

In time, varicap diodes were developed which exhibited large capacitance ranges, 100–500 pF, with relatively small changes in reverse bias: 0–5 V or 0–12 V. These newer devices allow electronically tuned AM broadcast receivers to be realized as well as a multitude of other functions requiring large capacitance changes at lower frequencies, generally below 10 MHz. Some designs of electronic security tag readers used in retail outlets require these high capacitance varicaps in their voltage-controlled oscillators.

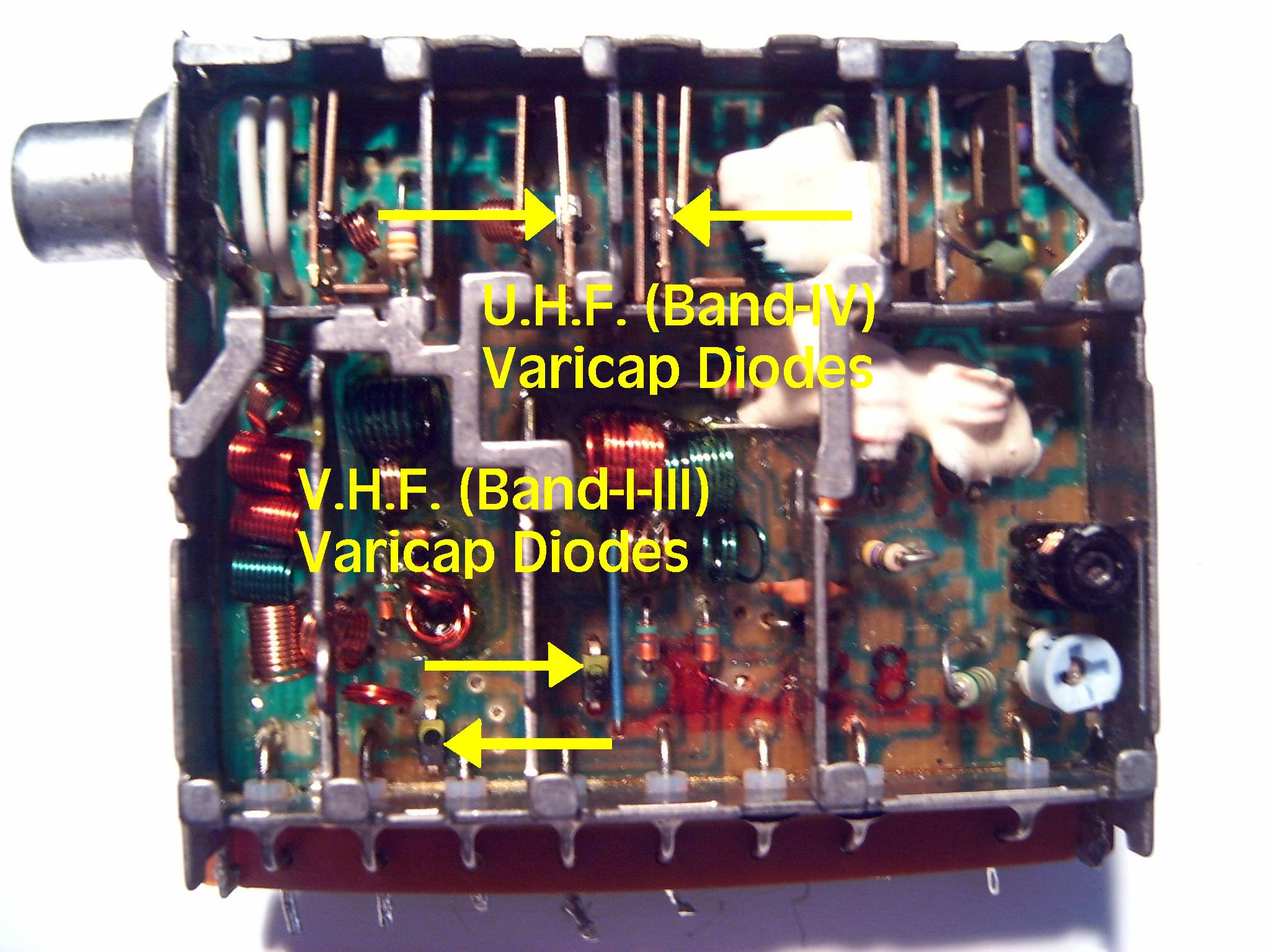
Australian market band I-III-U television tuner with varicaps highlighted

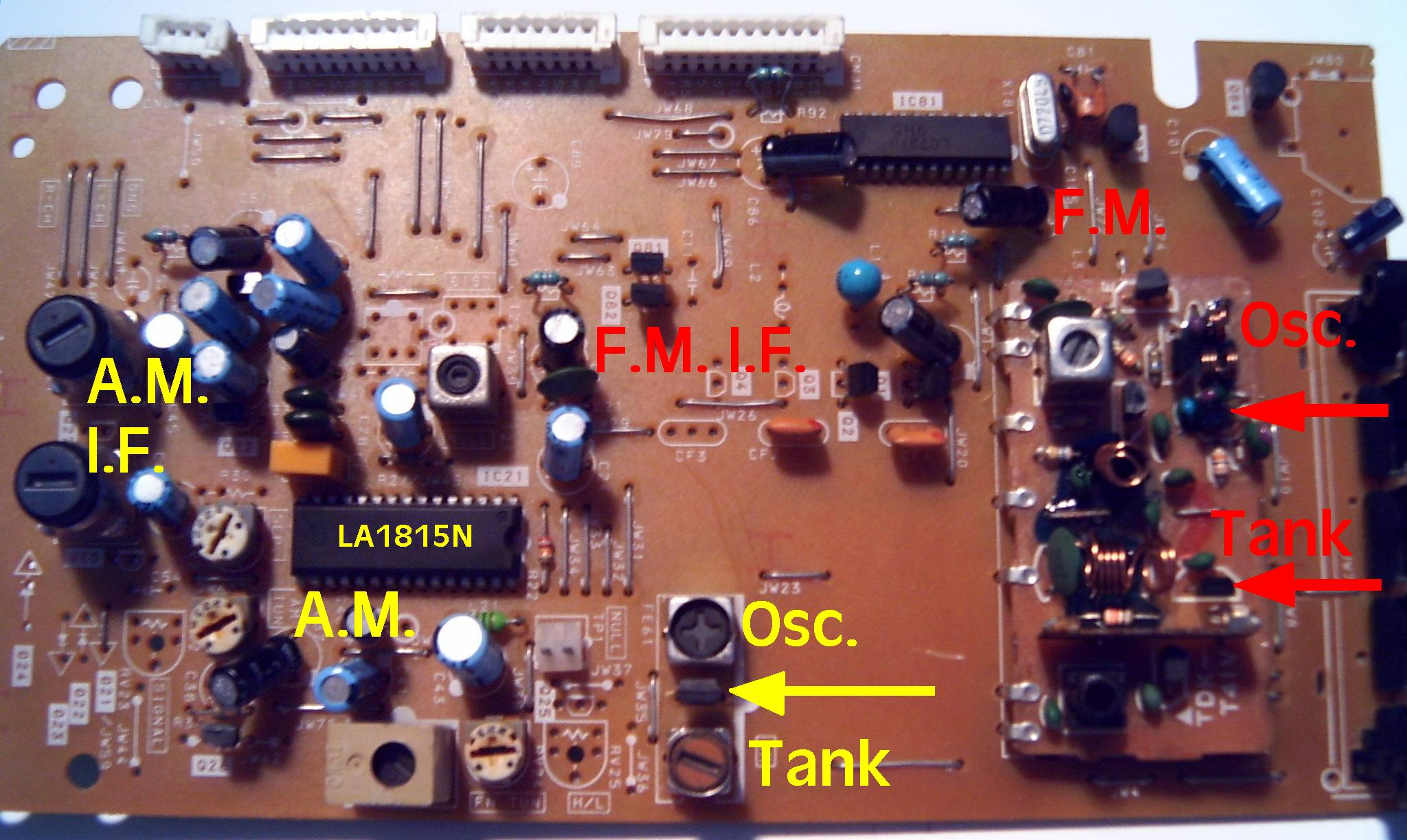
Consumer AM-FM broadcast tuner with varicaps highlighted

The three leaded devices depicted at the top of the page are generally two common cathode connected varicaps in a single package. In the consumer AM/FM tuner depicted at the right, a single dual-package varicap diode adjusts both the passband of the tank circuit (the main station selector), and the local oscillator with a single varicap for each. This is done to keep costs down – two dual packages could have been used, one for the tank and one for the oscillator, four diodes in all, and this is what was depicted in the application data for the LA1851N AM radio chip. Two lower-capacitance dual varactors used in the FM section (which operates at a frequency about one hundred times greater) are highlighted by red arrows. In this case four diodes are used, via a dual package for the tank / bandpass filter and a dual package for the local oscillator.

== Harmonic multiplication ==
In some applications, such as harmonic multiplication, a large signal amplitude alternating voltage is applied across a varicap to deliberately vary the capacitance at signal rate to generate higher harmonics, which are extracted through filtering. If a sine wave current of sufficient amplitude is applied driven through a varicap, the resultant voltage gets "peaked" into a more triangular shape, and odd harmonics are generated.

This was one early method used to generate microwave frequencies of moderate power, 1–2 GHz at 1–5 watts, from about 20 watts at a frequency of 3–400 MHz before adequate transistors had been developed to operate at this higher frequency. This technique is still used to generate much higher frequencies, in the 100 GHz – 1 THz range, where even the fastest GaAs transistors are still inadequate.

== Substitutes for varicap diodes ==
All semiconductor junction devices exhibit the effect, so they can be used as varicaps, but their characteristics will not be controlled and can vary widely between batches.

Popular makeshift varicaps include LEDs, 1N400X series rectifier diodes, Schottky rectifiers and various transistors used with their collector-base junctions reverse biased, particularly the 2N2222 and BC547. Reverse biasing the emitter-base junctions of transistors also is quite effective as long as the AC amplitude remains small. Maximum reverse bias voltage is usually between 5 and 7 Volts, before the avalanche process starts conducting. Higher-current devices with greater junction area tend to possess higher capacitance. The Philips BA 102 varicap and a common zener diode, the 1N5408, exhibit similar changes in junction capacitance, with the exception that the BA 102 possesses a specified set of characteristics in relation to junction capacitance (whereas the 1N5408 does not) and the "Q" of the 1N5408 is less.

Before the development of the varicap, motor driven variable capacitors or saturable-core reactors were used as electrically controllable reactances in the VCOs and filters of equipment like World War II German spectrum analyzers.

== See also ==
- Heterostructure barrier varactors are symmetric semiconductor devices with variable capacitance.
- Ferroelectric capacitors have a variable capacitance due to hysteresis effects.
- Diffusion capacitance
