= Sod (disambiguation) =

Sod is grass and the part of the soil beneath it held together by the roots.

Sod or SOD may also refer to:

== Language ==
- English colloquial word "sod" originally derived from Sodomite
- Arabic letter ṣād ص

== Science ==
- Superoxide dismutase (SOD), a group of antioxidant enzymes
- Small Outline Diode (SOD), an integrated circuit packaging type
- Septo-optic dysplasia (SOD), a congenital malformation syndrome of the optic nerve
- Sphincter of Oddi dysfunction (SOD), a digestive condition pertaining to the sphincter muscle of Oddi
- Sudden oak death (SOD), caused by Phytophthora ramorum

== Entertainment ==
- Soft On Demand (SOD), a Japanese porn company
- Spear of Destiny (SOD), episode of video game Wolfenstein 3D
  - SOD, a video game art mod by Jodi (art collective)
- Stormtroopers of Death (S.O.D.), a New York crossover thrash band
- S.O.D. - The Epic Years, a 1987 compilation album by Spear of Destiny (band)
- S.O.D., mixtape by Tony Yayo (2008)
- Season of Discovery in the game World of Warcraft

== Other abbreviations ==
- Separation of duties, or segregation of duties, for fraud and error prevention
- Scream Or Dance, an Indonesian Halloween-themed electronic dance music festival
- Shannon-One-Design, a class of sailing dinghy
- Special Operations Division of the U.S. Drug Enforcement Administration
- Systems-oriented design
- Screen of death, informal term for a critical operating system error (e.g. blue screen of death – BSOD)

== Other uses ==
- Sod Ryan (1905–1964), American football player
- Sod, West Virginia, an unincorporated community in northeastern Lincoln County, West Virginia, United States
- Sod, a type of Pardes (Jewish exegesis)

== See also ==
- Sods (disambiguation)
- Sod's law, UK: if something can go wrong, it will
- How to Be a Little Sod, book by Simon Brett
