= Joseph Gordon II =

American chemist (1945–2013)

- Born: December 25, 1945; Nashville, Tennessee
- Died: September 13, 2013 (aged 67); Morgan Hill, California
- Education: Harvard University (B.A.) Massachusetts Institute of Technology (Ph.D.)
- Spouse: Ruth Gordon
- Children: 1
- Scientific career
- Workplaces: California Institute of Technology IBM Applied Materials
- Thesis: Stereochemistry and mechanisms of intra-molecular rearrangements of tris-chelate complexes
- Doctoral advisor: Richard H. Holm

Joseph Grover Gordon II (December 25, 1945 – September 13, 2013) was an American chemist who worked for several companies, including IBM. A graduate of both Harvard and MIT, Gordon spent 33 years working at IBM's Almaden Research Center. Gordon's work was centered around thin films and batteries, and he was credited with 12 patents and more than 50 publications in his career. Gordon published multiple papers during his lifetime and was honored with multiple awards, including the National Organization for the Professional Advancement of Black Chemists and Chemical Engineers' Percy L. Julian Award.

== Early life and family ==
Joseph Gordon II was born on December 25, 1945, in Nashville, Tennessee to Joseph and Juanita (née Tarleton) Gordon. Gordon's mother was a graduate of St. Augustine's College (now St. Augustine's University) who worked as a teacher and as a secretary for the Manhattan Project in the mid-1940s. His father also attended St. Augustine's College, and after a few years in the army, obtained a medical degree from Meharry Medical College in Nashville. The elder Gordon also served in the Korean War.

The Gordons lived in many different places in the United States during Joseph's youth, eventually settling in Winston-Salem, North Carolina. Gordon was the eldest of four children; he had two brothers (Eric, born 1947, and Craig, born 1948) and one sister (Rhea, born 1954).

Gordon's father (also named Joseph Gordon) was chief of radiology at Kate Bitting Reynolds Memorial Hospital in Winston-Salem as well as an instructor at Wake Forest University; the elder Gordon helped to integrate North Carolina medical societies during his career. There is a scholarship fund named in honor of the elder Gordon at Wake Forest University.

== Education ==
Gordon was a talented student, and in the tenth grade was invited to go to Phillips Exeter Academy, a boarding school in Exeter, New Hampshire. Gordon was one of three Black students in his class of 240, and described the experience as a "culture shock"; nevertheless, he recalled the experience fondly, and participated in several sports. Gordon graduated from Phillips Exeter Academy in 1963.

Upon graduation, Gordon enrolled in Harvard University. Edgar Bright Wilson was Gordon's adviser during his senior year; partially due to Wilson's advice, Gordon decided to pursue graduate work in the field of inorganic chemistry, rather than theoretical chemistry. Gordon earned a B.A. from Harvard in 1966 in physics and chemistry, graduating cum laude.

After a summer internship in La Gaude, France, in the summer of 1966, Gordon enrolled in the graduate school at the Massachusetts Institute of Technology in the fall. His advisor was Richard H. Holm. Although initially concentrating in physical chemistry, Gordon earned a Ph.D. in inorganic chemistry in 1970. Gordon's dissertation was titled "Stereochemistry and mechanisms of intra-molecular rearrangements of tris-chelate complexes". Gordon was also awarded a fellowship from the National Science Foundation during this time.

== Career ==
=== Early career ===
Soon after graduation, Gordon was hired at the California Institute of Technology as an assistant professor and researcher. Gordon taught at Caltech from 1970 until 1975; however, this time included a brief enlistment in the United States Navy beginning in 1971. Upon his return to Caltech in 1972, Gordon was not able to fully revive the research program he began before his enlistment; however, a summer sabbatical at IBM led to an interview and a job offer.

=== Time at IBM ===
Gordon was initially hired in 1975 by IBM as a research staff member at their Almaden Research Center in San Jose, California, where he began his work on thin films.After a few years, he was promoted to his first management position at IBM; the first team he managed worked on experiments and novel methodologies in the field of interfacial electrochemistry. Gordon managed this team for around ten years. Notably, Dr. Gordan, with the help of his colleague, Jerry Swalen was able make the first use of surface plasmons to examine Langmuir films on metal surfaces. This technique would later get expanded allowing the investigation of the interaction between charged metal electrodes and aqueous electrolytes.

In 1984, Gordon received the IBM Research Division Award for his help in resolving an issue with printed circuit boards IBM was producing for mainframe computers. Gordon also received the IBM Outstanding Technical Achievement Award for his work in interfacial electrochemistry in 1988; this is an infrequently awarded honor that requires significant external recognition for an IBM employee's work.

In 1990, Gordon was promoted to manager of IBM's Materials Science Department. Although this involved more administrative duties than previous positions he held, Gordon still remained involved in research work, and kept publishing scholarly papers into the mid-1990s. Gordon was further promoted in 2000 to technical staff member, where he served as chief of staff to the Almaden Research Center's laboratory director. In both 1997 and 2004, Gordon was awarded IBM Technical Group Awards for work with water molecules and photopolymerized sol-gel, respectively.

Beginning in 2004, Gordon was appointed to several executive-level management positions at IBM; the last position he held before leaving IBM in 2009 was Senior Manager for Materials for Advanced Technology. Around this time, Gordon also worked on issues surrounding lithium ion battery fires that had plagued IBM's (now Lenovo's) Think Pad laptops.

=== After IBM ===
In 2009, Gordon was recruited by the Chief Technology Officer of Applied Materials, in Santa Clara, California; Gordon spent the rest of his career there. His work centered around finding new business opportunities for the company in the field of energy storage.

=== Professional associations and awards ===
Gordon was involved in multiple professional organizations during (and after) his time at IBM, including the American Chemical Society, the National Research Council, the Electrochemical Society, the American Association for the Advancement of Science, the National Organization for the Professional Advancement of Black Chemists and Chemical Engineers (NOBCChE), and the Society for Analytical Chemistry. Gordon was also elected a fellow of the American Physical Society in 2000.

During his career, Gordon was profiled in trade publications such as U.S. Black Engineer, Professional, and Black Enterprise. Gordon also won multiple awards during his career. In 1993, NOBCChE named him the winner of the Percy L. Julian Award; the award honors Black scientists and engineers who make significant contributions to their fields. In addition, U.S. Black Engineer awarded Gordon with their "Outstanding Technical Contribution" award in 1990.

Gordon chaired or organized multiple conferences and symposiums during his career, including chairing the Gordon Research Conference on Electrochemistry in 1987 and co-organizing symposiums for the Electrochemical Society.

== Personal life ==
Gordon married his wife, Ruth, in 1972; they met in Winston-Salem but reconnected during his time at Caltech. They had one son, Perry.

Gordon died on September 13, 2013, in Morgan Hill, California. He was 67.

== Selected works ==
- Barz, F., Gordon, J. G., Philpott, M. R., & Weaver, M. J. (1982). Effect of laser illumination oxidation-reduction cycles upon surface-enhanced Raman scaterring from silver electrodes. Chemical Physics Letters, 91(4), 291–295. https://doi.org/10.1016/0009-2614(82)80158-9
- Kanazawa, K. K., & Gordon, J. G. (1985). The oscillation frequency of a quartz resonator in contact with liquid. Analytica Chimica Acta, 175, 99–105. https://doi.org/10.1016/s0003-2670(00)82721-x
- Liu, Y., Sun, L., Sikha, G., Isidorsson, J., Lim, S., Anders, A., Kwak, B. L., & Gordon, J. G. (2014). 2-D mathematical modeling for a large electrochromic window—part I. Solar Energy Materials and Solar Cells, 120, 1–8. https://doi.org/10.1016/j.solmat.2013.07.030
- Pettinger, B., Philpott, M. R., & Gordon, J. G. (1981). Further observations of the surface enhanced Raman spectrum of water on silver and copper electrodes. Surface Science, 105(2–3), 469–474. https://doi.org/10.1016/0039-6028(81)90012-1
- Weaver, M. J., Hupp, J. T., Barz, F., Gordon, J. G., & Philpott, M. R. (1984). Surface-enhanced Raman spectroscopy of electrochemically characterized interfaces. Journal of Electroanalytical Chemistry and Interfacial Electrochemistry, 160(1–2), 321–333. https://doi.org/10.1016/s0022-0728(84)80135-7
