= S3K =

S3K may refer to:

- Sonic 3 & Knuckles, a Mega Drive video game that can be played when Sonic 3 cartridge connected to Sonic & Knuckles
- SimCity 3000
- S3K, a diode electrical component
