= 1N58xx Schottky diodes =

Schottky diodes

A schematic symbol for Schottky diodes

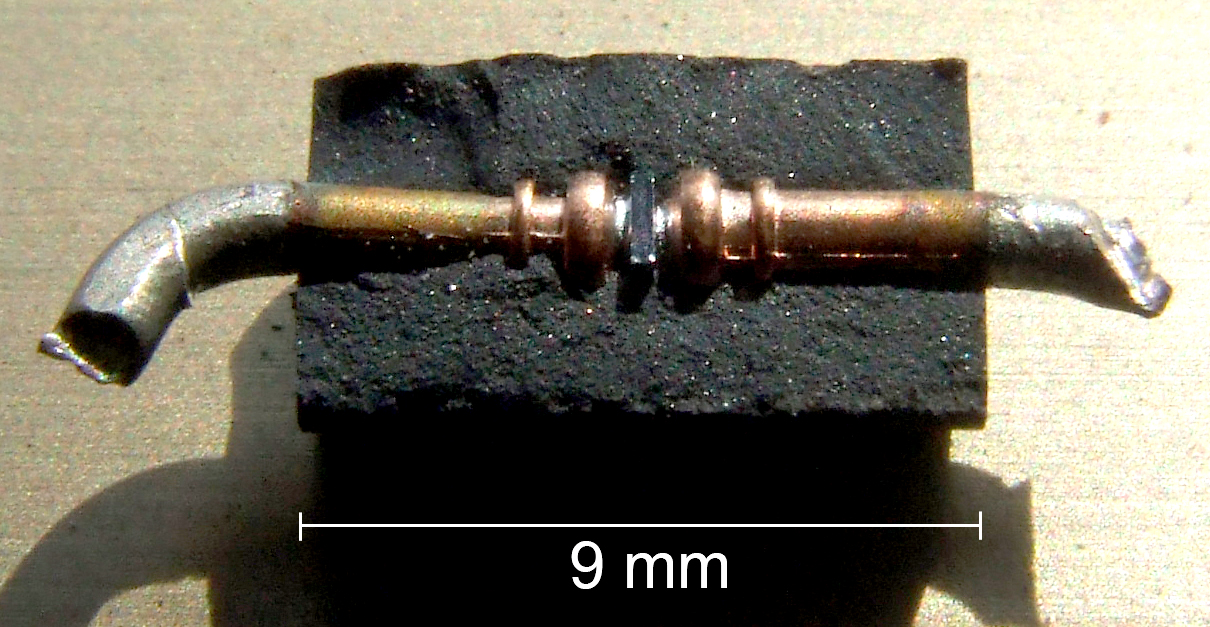
1N5822 Schottky diode with cut-open packaging. The semiconductor in the center makes a Schottky barrier against one metal electrode (providing rectifying action) and an ohmic contact with the other electrode.

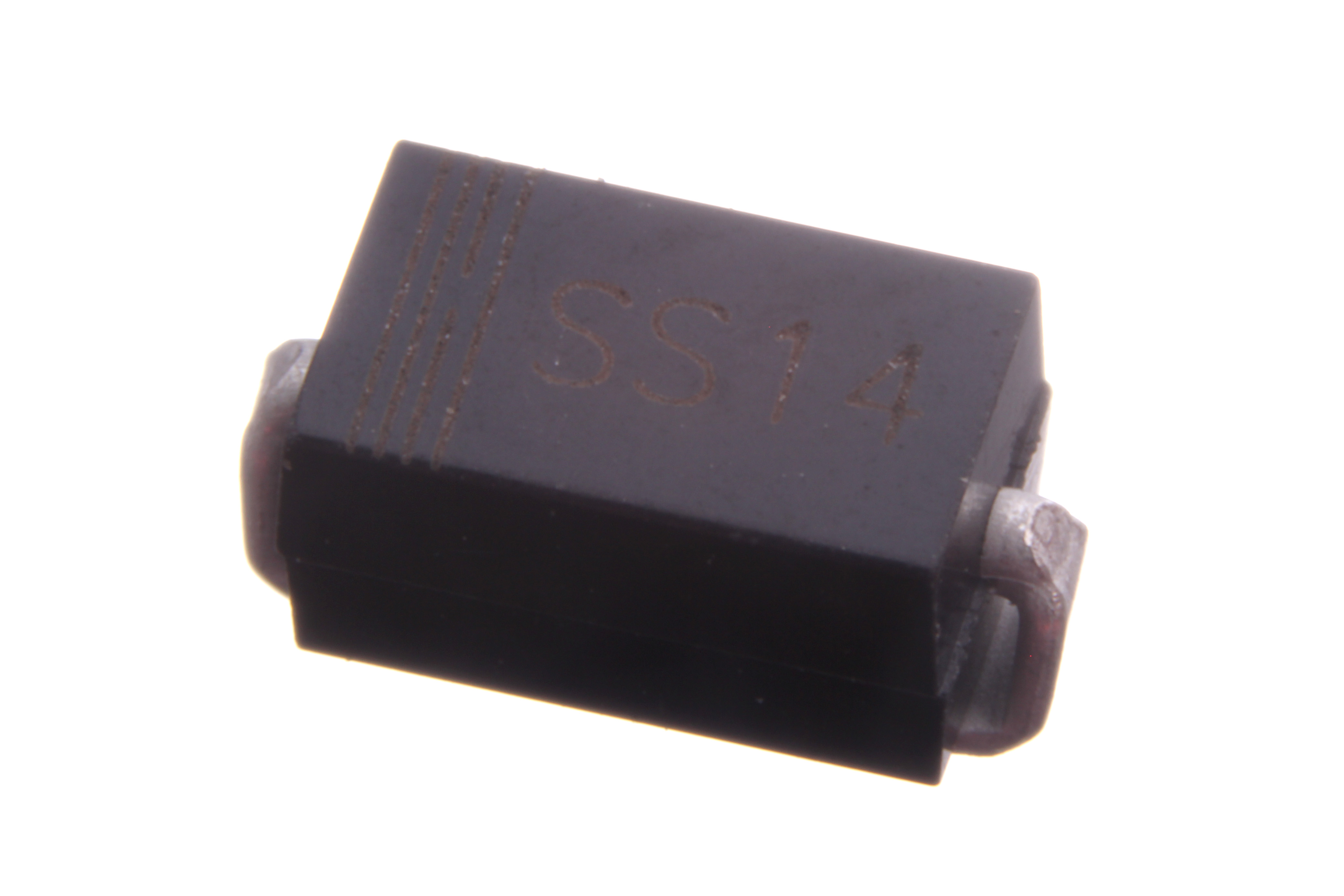
SS14 schottky diode in DO-214AC (SMA) (SOD-106) surface-mount package version of 1N5819

The 1N58xx is a series of medium power, fast, low voltage Schottky diodes, which consists of part numbers 1N5817 through 1N5825.

== Overview ==
The 1N581x are typically packaged in the DO-41 axial through-hole case, and in many cases are interchangeable with the 1N4001 series. The 1N582x are typically packaged in the DO-201AD through-hole case, and in many cases are interchangeable with the 1N54xx series.

Being Schottky diodes, the 1N58xx parts have roughly half the forward voltage drop of the 1N400x/1N540x series diodes, which improves efficiency in applications where they are usually forward-biased, such as power converters. The cost is a lower voltage rating and higher reverse leakage current (approximately 1 mA at room temperature and increasing with temperature).

Common surface-mount relatives of the 1N58xx series are the SS1x and SS3x series, such as the SS14 (1 ampere) and SS34 (3 ampere) surface-mount parts.

Diode part numbers
Voltage	Thru-hole			Surface-mount		
Voltage	1 A (DO-41)	3 A (DO-201AD)	5 A (TopHat)	1 A (SMA)	3 A (SMC)	5 A (SMC)
20 Volt	1N5817	1N5820	1N5823	SS12	SS32	SS52
30 Volt	1N5818	1N5821	1N5824	SS13	SS33	SS53
40 Volt	1N5819	1N5822	1N5825	SS14	SS34	SS54
50 Volt	—	—	—	SS15	SS35	—
60 Volt	—	—	—	SS16	SS36	—
80 Volt	—	—	—	SS18	SS38	—
100 Volt	—	—	—	SS110	SS310	—
150 Volt	—	—	—	SS115	SS315	—
200 Volt	—	—	—	—	SS320	—
Datasheet						—

== See also ==
- 1N400x rectifier diodes
- 1N4148 signal diode
