= Melf =

Melf may refer to:

- Melf, also known as Prince Brightflame; a grey elven archmage in Dungeons and Dragons.
- Metal electrode leadless face, a type of leadless cylindrical electronic surface mount device that is metallized at its ends.
