= 1N4148 signal diode =

Silicon switching diode

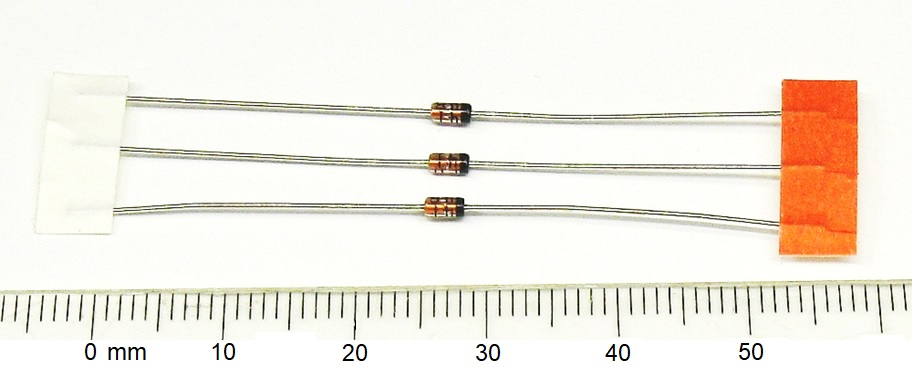
Three 1N4148 diodes in glass DO-35 axial package. The black band on the right is the cathode side.

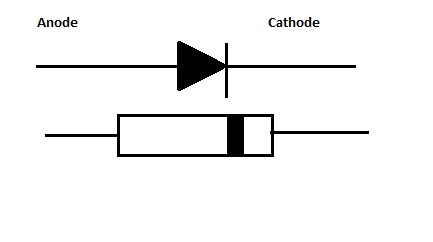
Diode schematic symbol vs cathode marking on the package.

The 1N4148 is a standard silicon switching signal diode. It is one of the most popular and long-lived switching diodes because of its dependable specifications and low cost. Its name follows the JEDEC nomenclature. The 1N4148 is useful in switching applications up to about 100 MHz with a reverse-recovery time of no more than 4 ns.

== History ==
Texas Instruments announced the 1N914 diode in 1960. It was registered at JEDEC by Texas Instruments no later than 1961, and was second-sourced by 11 manufacturers that same year.

The 1N4148 was registered at JEDEC in 1968 as a silicon switching signal diode for military and industrial applications. It was second-sourced by many manufacturers; Texas Instruments listed their version of the device in an October 1966 data sheet.

The 1N914 and 1N4148 have an enduring popularity in low-current applications.

== Overview ==
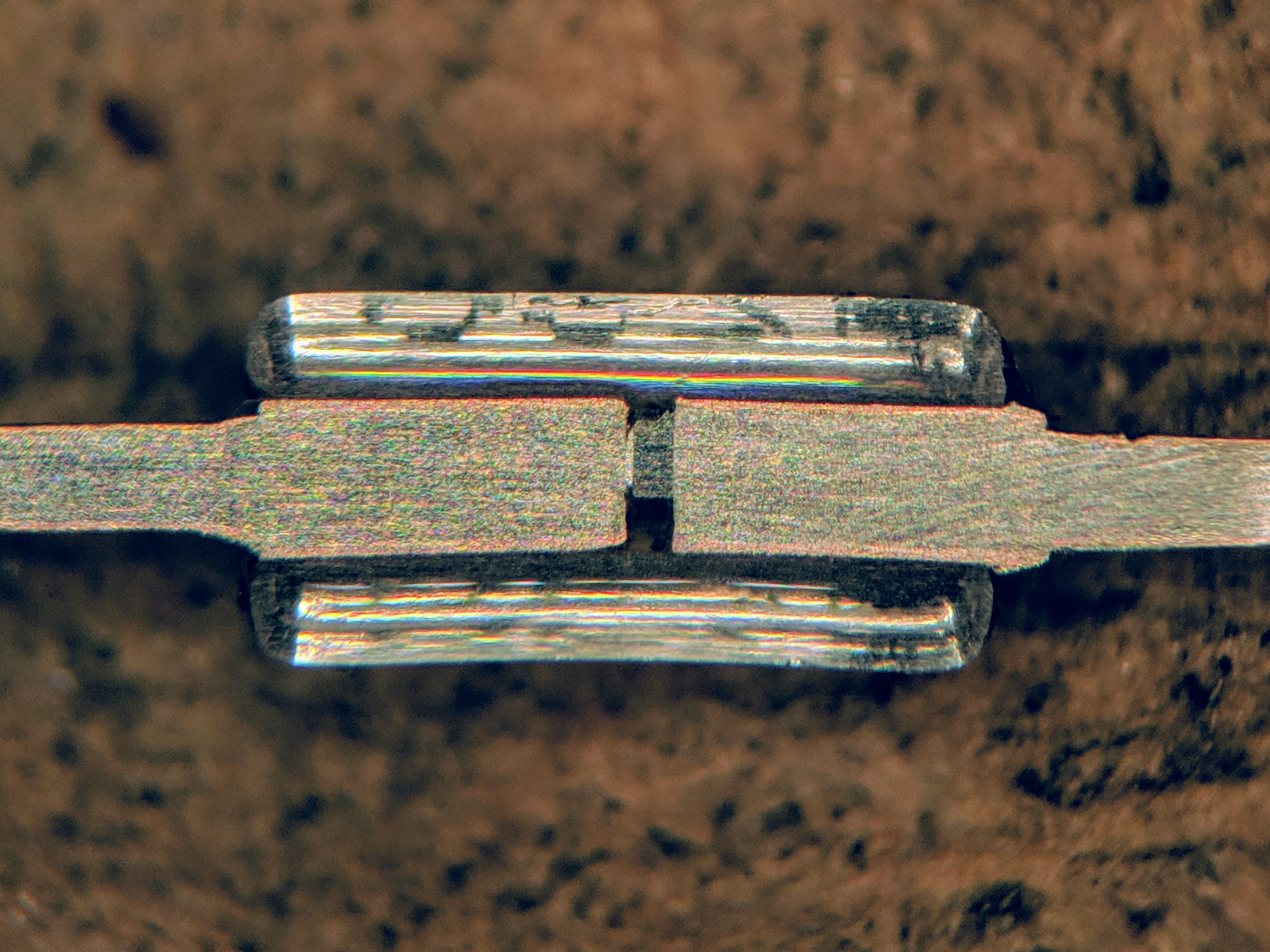
Cross section of a 1N914 in glass axial package

As the most common mass-produced switching diode, the 1N4148 replaced the older 1N914. They can be used interchangeably, and are cross-reference replacements for each other. They differed mainly in their leakage current specification, however, today most manufacturers list common specifications. For example, Vishay lists the same leakage current for both parts:

- 25 nA at -20 V, 25°C
- 5 μA at -75 V, 25°C
- 50 μA at -20 V, 150°C

=== Packages ===
The JEDEC registered part numbers 1N914 and 1N4148 were originally only available in an axial package, but over time similar parts became available in surface-mount packages too.

Through-hole package

- 1N4148 in DO-35 glass axial package.

Surface-mount packages

- LL4148 in MiniMELF package.
- 1N4148W in SOD-123 package.
- 1N4148WS in SOD-323 package.
- 1N4148WT in SOD-523 package.

Note: Some 1N4148 family surface-mount packages are marked with "T4" text.

=== Specifications ===
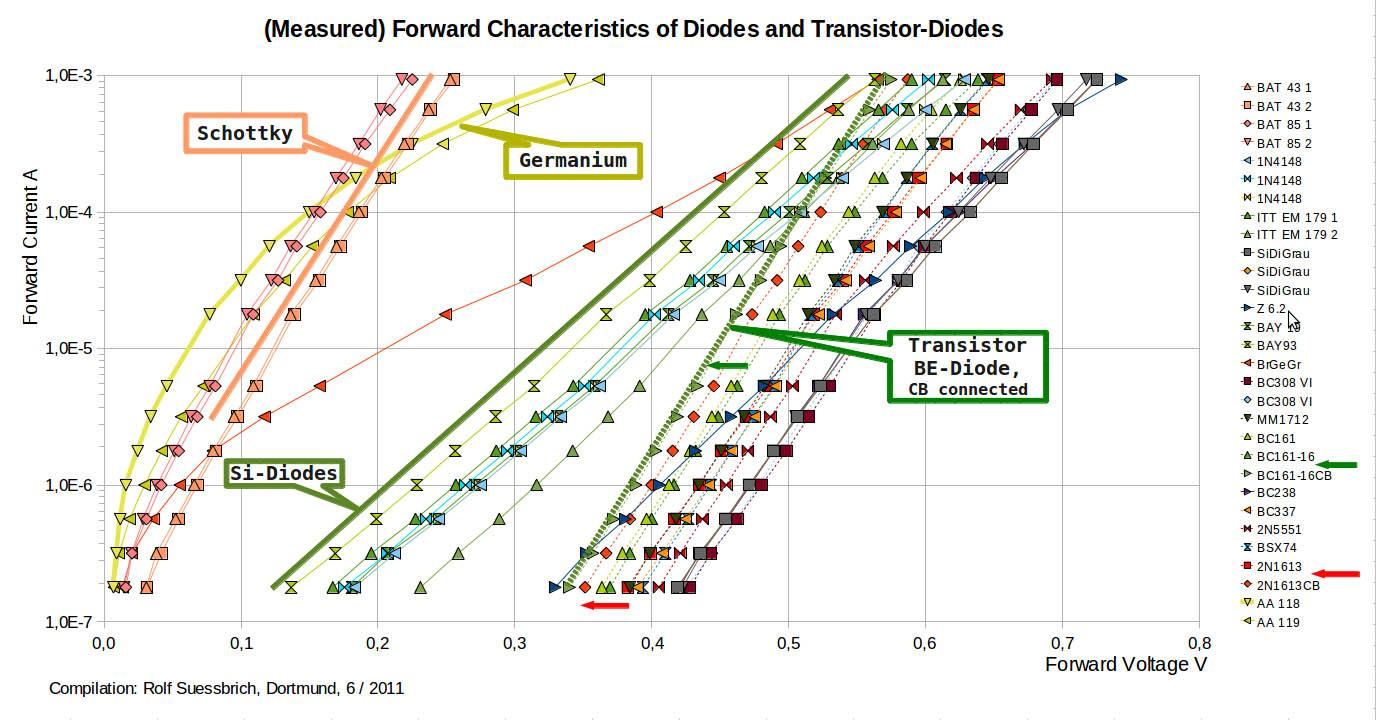
I–V (current vs. voltage) graph of various diodes, including 1N4148

Absolute maximum ratings (stress ratings, consult datasheet for recommended ratings)

- V_{RRM} = 100 V (maximum repetitive reverse voltage)
- I_{O} = 200 mA (average rectified forward current)
- I_{F} = 300 mA (DC forward current)
- I_{f} = 400 mA (recurring peak forward current)
- I_{FSM} = 1 A at 1 s pulse width; 4 A at 1 μs pulse width (non-repetitive peak forward surge current)

Electrical and thermal characteristics

- V_{F} = 1 V at 10 mA (maximum forward voltage)
- V_{R} = 75 V at 5 μA; 100 V at 100 μA (minimum breakdown voltage and reverse leakage current)
- t_{rr} = 4 ns (maximum reverse-recovery time)
- P_{D} = 500 mW (maximum power dissipation)

== See also ==
- 1N400x rectifier diodes
- 1N58xx Schottky diodes
- Diode logic
