= Sods (disambiguation) =

Sods is a term used in the Allegheny Mountains of eastern West Virginia for a mountain top meadow or bog.

Sods or Sod's may also refer to:

- Plural of sod
- Sods, original name of Sort Sol, Danish punk rock band
- Sod's law: if something can go wrong, it will
- Sod's Law (album) by Spear of Destiny

== See also ==
- Odds & Sods, a 1974 album by The Who
