= Frequency multiplier =

Electronic circuit

In electronics, a frequency multiplier is an electronic circuit that generates an output signal which has a frequency that is a harmonic (multiple) of its input frequency.

Frequency multipliers consist of a nonlinear circuit that distorts the input signal and consequently generates harmonics of the input signal. A subsequent bandpass filter selects the desired harmonic frequency and removes the unwanted fundamental and other harmonics from the output.

Frequency multipliers are often used in frequency synthesizers and communications circuits. It can be more economical to develop a lower frequency signal with lower power and less expensive devices, and then use a frequency multiplier chain to generate an output frequency in the microwave or millimeter wave range. Some modulation schemes, such as frequency modulation, survive the nonlinear distortion without ill effect (but schemes such as amplitude modulation do not).

Frequency multiplication is also used in nonlinear optics. The nonlinear distortion in crystals can be used to generate harmonics of laser light.

== Theory ==
A pure sine wave has a single frequency f

$$x(t) = A\sin(2 \pi ft)\,$$

If the sine wave is applied to a linear circuit, such as a non–distortion amplifier, the output is still a sine wave (but may acquire a phase shift). However, if the sine wave is applied to a nonlinear circuit, the resulting distortion creates harmonics; frequency components at integer multiples nf of the fundamental frequency f. The distorted signal can be described by a Fourier series in f.

$$x(t) = \sum_{k=-\infty}^{\infty} c_k e^{j 2 \pi k f t}.$$

The nonzero c_{k} represent the generated harmonics. The Fourier coefficients are given by integrating over the fundamental period T:

$$c_k = \frac{1}{T}\int_{0}^{T} x(t) \, e^{-j 2 \pi k t / T}\, dt$$

So a frequency multiplier can be built from a nonlinear electronic component which generates a series of harmonics, followed by a bandpass filter which passes one of the harmonics to the output and blocks the others.

From a conversion efficiency standpoint, the nonlinear circuit should maximize the coefficient for the desired harmonic and minimize the others. Consequently, the transcribing function is often specially chosen. Easy choices are to use an even function to generate even harmonics or an odd function for odd harmonics. See Even and odd functions#Harmonics. A full wave rectifier, for example, is good for making a doubler. To produce a times-3 multiplier, the original signal may be input to an amplifier that is over driven to produce nearly a square wave. This signal is high in 3rd order harmonics and can be filtered to produce the desired x3 outcome.

YIG multipliers often want to select an arbitrary harmonic, so they use a stateful distortion circuit that converts the input sine wave into an approximate impulse train. The ideal (but impractical) impulse train generates an infinite number of (weak) harmonics. In practice, an impulse train generated by a monostable circuit will have many usable harmonics. YIG multipliers using step recovery diodes may, for example, take an input frequency of 1 to 2 GHz and produce outputs up to 18 GHz. Sometimes the frequency multiplier circuit will adjust the width of the impulses to improve conversion efficiency for a specific harmonic.

== Circuits ==
=== Diode ===
Clipping circuits. Full wave bridge doubler.

=== Class C amplifier and multiplier ===
Efficiently generating power becomes more important at high power levels. Linear Class A amplifiers are at best 25 percent efficient. Push-pull Class B amplifiers are at best 50 percent efficient. The basic problem is the amplifying element is dissipating power. Switching Class C amplifiers are nonlinear, but they can be better than 50 percent efficient because an ideal switch does not dissipate any power.

A clever design can use the nonlinear Class C amplifier for both gain and as a frequency multiplier.

=== Step recovery diode ===
Generating a large number of useful harmonics requires a fast nonlinear device, such as a step recovery diode.

Microwave generators may use a step recovery diode impulse generator followed by a tunable YIG filter. The YIG filter has a yttrium iron garnet sphere that is tuned with a magnetic field. The step recovery diode impulse generator is driven at a subharmonic of the desired output frequency. An electromagnet then tunes the YIG filter to select the desired harmonic.

=== Varactor diode ===
Resistive loaded varactors. Regenerative varactors. Penfield.

Frequency multipliers have much in common with frequency mixers, and some of the same nonlinear devices are used for both: transistors operated in Class C and diodes. In transmitting circuits many of the amplifying devices (vacuum tubes or transistors) operate nonlinearly and create harmonics, so an amplifier stage can be made a multiplier by tuning the tuned circuit at the output to a multiple of the input frequency. Usually the power (gain) produced by the nonlinear device drops off rapidly at the higher harmonics, so most frequency multipliers just double or triple the frequency, and multiplication by higher factors is accomplished by cascading doubler and tripler stages.

=== Previous uses ===
Frequency multipliers use circuits tuned to a harmonic of the input frequency. Non-linear elements such as diodes may be added to enhance the production of harmonic frequencies. Since the power in the harmonics declines rapidly, usually a frequency multiplier is tuned to only a small multiple (twice, three times, or five times) of the input frequency. Usually amplifiers are inserted in a chain of frequency multipliers to ensure adequate signal level at the final frequency.

Since the tuned circuits have a limited bandwidth, if the base frequency is changed significantly (more than one percent or so), the multiplier stages may have to be adjusted; this can take significant time if there are many stages.

=== Microelectromechanical (MEMS) frequency doubler ===
An electric-field driven micromechanical cantilever resonator is one of the most fundamental and widely studied structures in MEMS, which can provide a high Q and narrow bandpass filtering function. The inherent square-law nonlinearity of the voltage-to-force transfer function of a cantilever resonator's capacitive transducer can be employed for the realization of frequency doubling effect. Due to the low-loss attribute (or equivalently, a high Q) offered by MEMS devices, improved circuit performance can be expected from a micromechanical frequency doubler than semiconductor devices utilized for the same task.

=== Graphene based frequency multipliers ===
Graphene based FETs have also been employed for frequency doubling with more than 90% converting efficiency.

In fact, all ambipolar transistors can be used for designing frequency multiplier circuits. Graphene can work over a large frequency range due to its unique characteristics.

== Phase-locked loops with frequency dividers ==
A phase-locked loop (PLL) uses a reference frequency to generate a multiple of that frequency. A voltage-controlled oscillator (VCO) is initially tuned roughly to the range of the desired frequency multiple. The signal from the VCO is divided down using frequency dividers by the multiplication factor. The divided signal and the reference frequency are fed into a phase comparator. The output of the phase comparator is a voltage that is proportional to the phase difference. After passing through a low pass filter and being converted to the proper voltage range, this voltage is fed to the VCO to adjust the frequency. This adjustment increases the frequency as the phase of the VCO's signal lags that of the reference signal and decreases the frequency as the lag decreases (or lead increases). The VCO will stabilize at the desired frequency multiple. This type of PLL is a type of frequency synthesizer.

=== Fractional-N synthesizer ===
In some PLLs the reference frequency may also be divided by an integer multiple before being input to the phase comparator. This allows the synthesis of frequencies that are N/M times the reference frequency.

This can be accomplished in a different manner by periodically changing the integer value of an integer-N frequency divider, effectively resulting in a multiplier with both whole number and fractional component. Such a multiplier is called a fractional-N synthesizer after its fractional component. Fractional-N synthesizers provide an effective means of achieving fine frequency resolution with lower values of N, allowing loop architectures with tens of thousands of times less phase noise than alternative designs with lower reference frequencies and higher integer N values. They also allow a faster settling time because of their higher reference frequencies, allowing wider closed and open loop bandwidths.

==== Delta sigma synthesizer ====
A delta sigma synthesizer adds a randomization to programmable-N frequency divider of the fractional-N synthesizer. This is done to shrink sidebands created by periodic changes of an integer-N frequency divider.

=== PLL references ===
- Egan, William F. 2000. Frequency Synthesis by Phase-lock, 2nd Ed., John Wiley & Sons, ISBN 0-471-32104-4
- Fractional N frequency synthesizer with modulation compensation U.S. Patent 4,686,488, Attenborough, C. (1987, August 11)
- Programmable fractional-N frequency synthesizer U.S. Patent 5,224,132, Bar-Giora Goldberg, (1993, June 29)

== See also ==
- Heterostructure barrier varactor
- CPU multiplier
