= Schottky diode =

Semiconductor diode

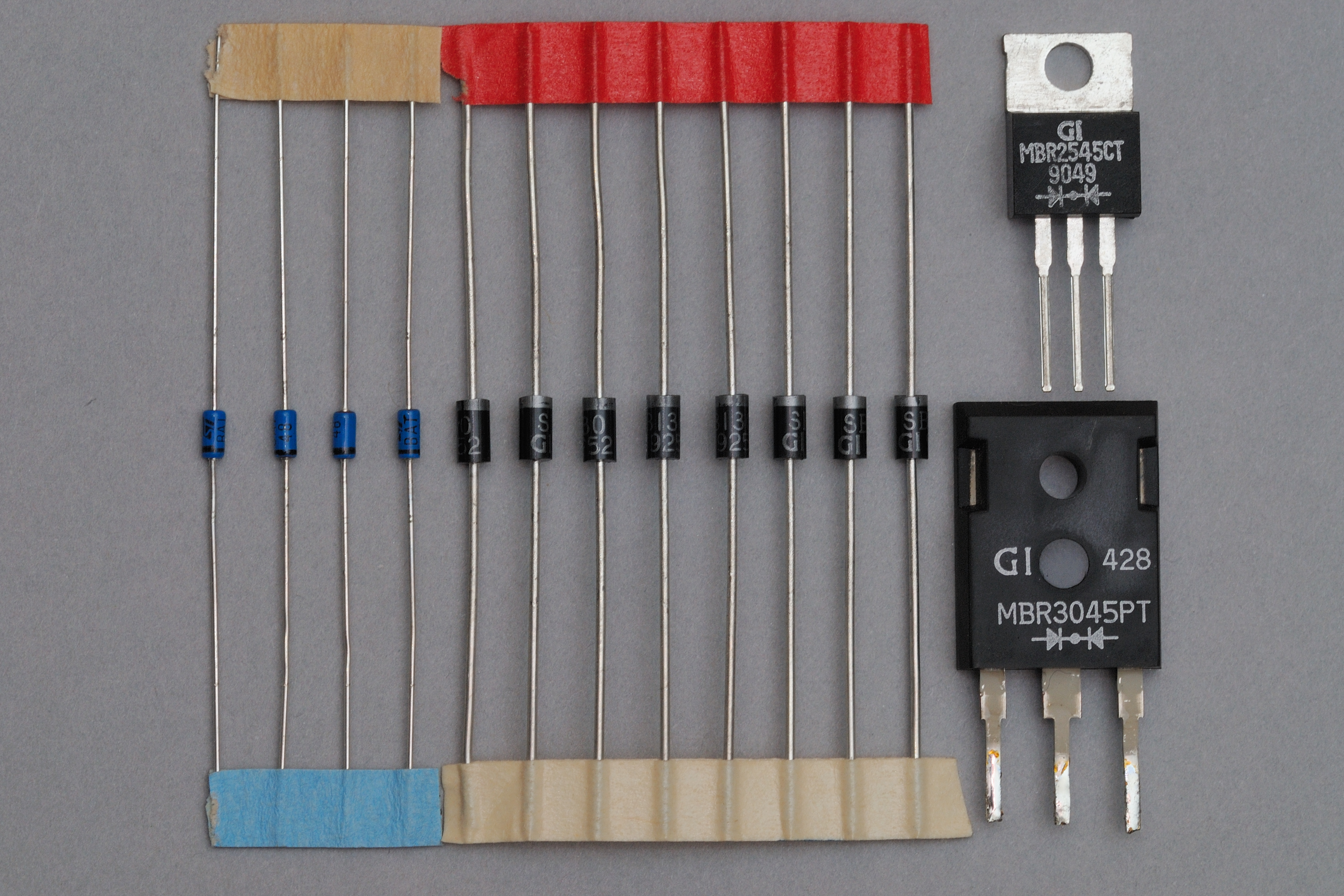
- Various Schottky-barrier diodes: Small-signal RF devices (left), medium- and high-power Schottky rectifying diodes (middle and right)
- Component type: Passive
- Inventor: Walter Schottky
- Pin names: Anode and cathode

Electronic symbol

The Schottky diode (named after the German physicist Walter Schottky), also known as Schottky barrier diode or hot-carrier diode, is a semiconductor diode formed by the junction of a semiconductor with a metal. It has a low forward voltage drop and a very fast switching action. The cat's-whisker detectors used in the early days of wireless and metal rectifiers used in early power applications can be considered primitive Schottky diodes.

When sufficient forward voltage is applied, a current flows in the forward direction. A silicon p–n diode has a typical forward voltage of 600–700 mV, while the Schottky's forward voltage is 150–450 mV. This lower forward voltage requirement allows higher switching speeds and better system efficiency.

== Construction ==
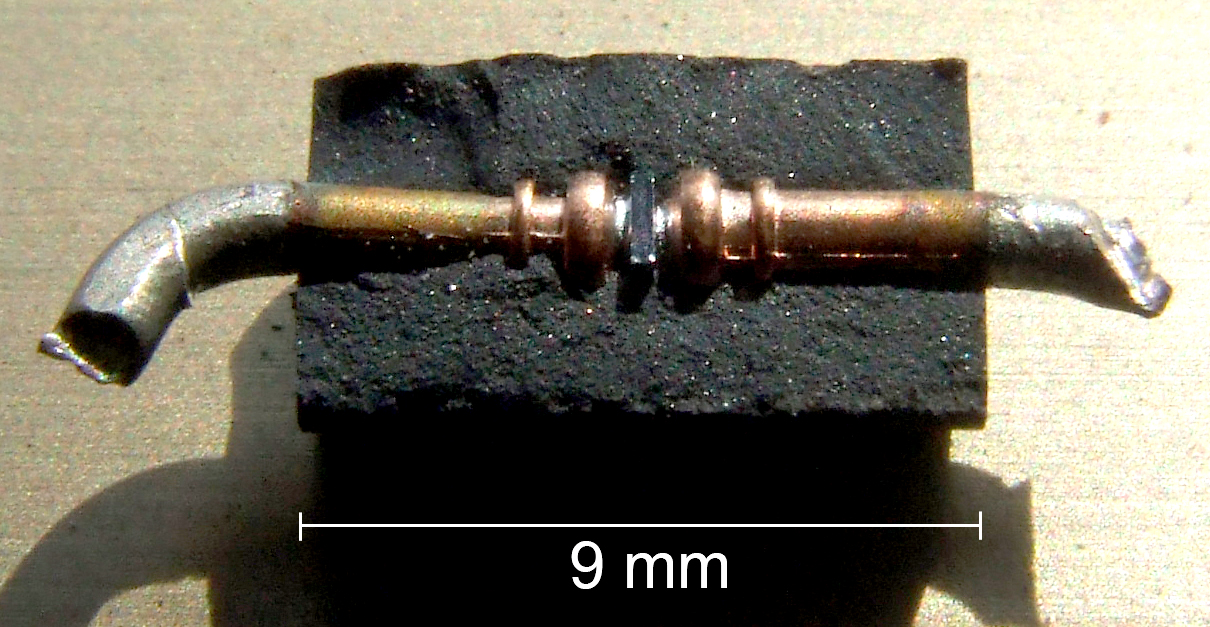
1N5822 Schottky diode with cut-open packaging. The semiconductor in the center makes a Schottky barrier against one metal electrode (providing rectifying action) and an ohmic contact with the other electrode.

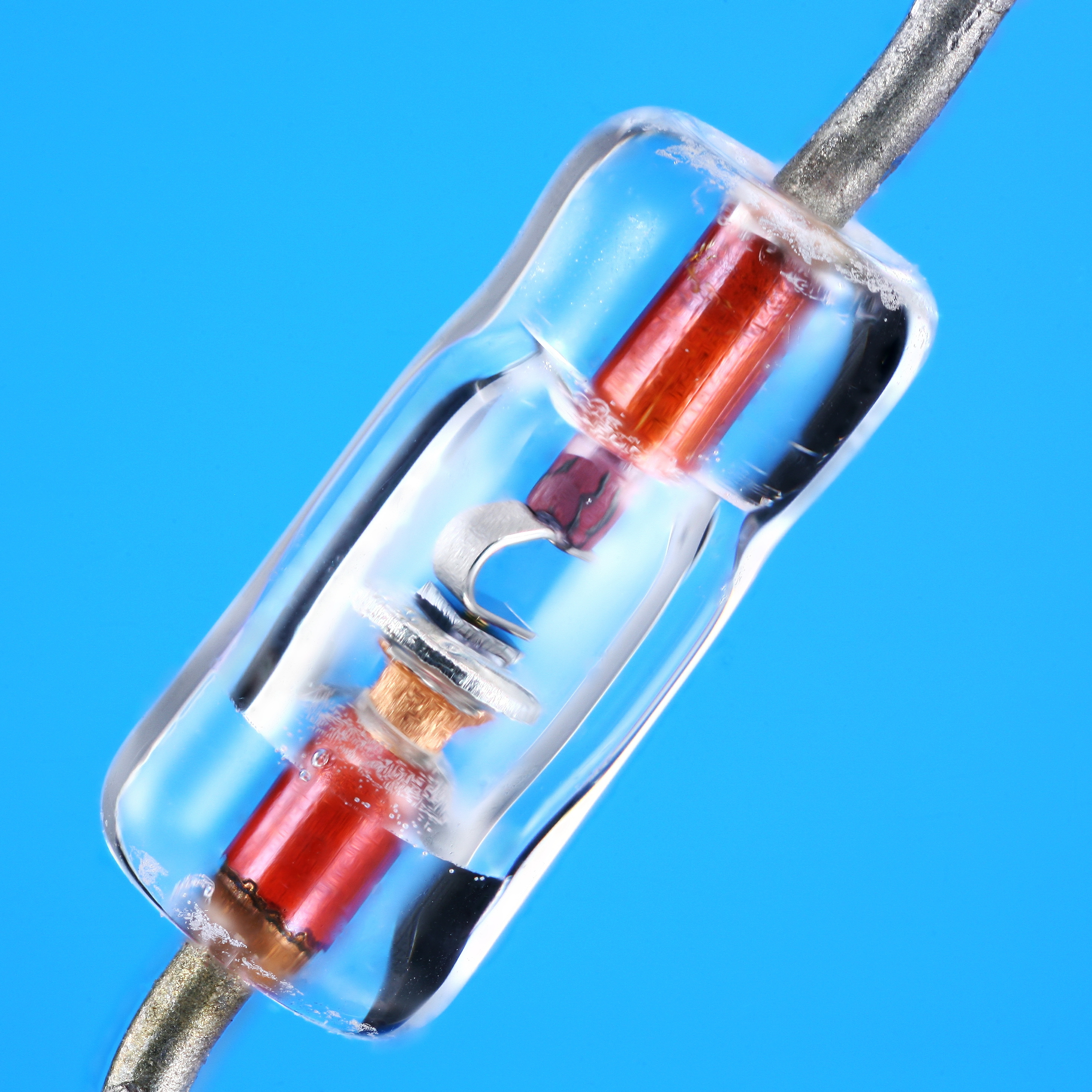
HP 5082-2800 Schottky barrier diode for general purpose applications

A metal–semiconductor junction is formed between a metal and a semiconductor, creating a Schottky barrier (instead of a semiconductor–semiconductor junction as in conventional diodes). Typical metals used are molybdenum, platinum, chromium or tungsten, and certain silicides (e.g., palladium silicide and platinum silicide), whereas the semiconductor would typically be n-type silicon. The metal side acts as the anode, and n-type semiconductor acts as the cathode of the diode; meaning conventional current can flow from the metal side to the semiconductor side, but not in the opposite direction. This Schottky barrier results in both very fast switching and low forward voltage drop.

The choice of the combination of the metal and semiconductor determines the forward voltage of the diode. Both n- and p-type semiconductors can develop Schottky barriers. However, the p-type typically has a much lower forward voltage. As the reverse leakage current increases dramatically with lowering the forward voltage, it cannot be too low, so the usually employed range is about 0.15–0.45 V, and p-type semiconductors are employed only rarely. Titanium silicide and other refractory silicides, which are able to withstand the temperatures needed for source/drain annealing in CMOS processes, usually have too low a forward voltage to be useful, so processes using these silicides therefore usually do not offer Schottky diodes.

With increased doping of the semiconductor, the width of the depletion region drops. Below a certain width, the charge carriers can tunnel through the depletion region. At very high doping levels, the junction does not behave as a rectifier any more and becomes an ohmic contact. This can be used for the simultaneous formation of ohmic contacts and diodes, as a diode will form between the silicide and lightly doped n-type region, and an ohmic contact will form between the silicide and the heavily doped n- or p-type region. Lightly doped p-type regions pose a problem, as the resulting contact has too high a resistance for a good ohmic contact, but too low a forward voltage and too high a reverse leakage to make a good diode.

As the edges of the Schottky contact are fairly sharp, a high electric field occurs around them, which limits how large the reverse breakdown voltage threshold can be. Various strategies are used, from guard rings to overlaps of metallisation to reduce the field. The guard rings consume valuable die area and are used primarily for larger higher-voltage diodes, while overlapping metallization is employed primarily with smaller low-voltage diodes.

Schottky diodes are often used as antisaturation clamps in Schottky transistors. Schottky diodes made from palladium silicide (PdSi) are excellent due to their lower forward voltage (which has to be lower than the forward voltage of the base-collector junction). The Schottky temperature coefficient is lower than the coefficient of the B–C junction, which limits the use of PdSi at higher temperatures.

For power Schottky diodes, the parasitic resistances of the buried n+ layer and the epitaxial n-type layer become important. The resistance of the epitaxial layer is more important than it is for a transistor, as the current must cross its entire thickness. However, it serves as a distributed ballasting resistor over the entire area of the junction and, under usual conditions, prevents localized thermal runaway.

In comparison with the power p–n diodes, the Schottky diodes are less rugged. The junction is in direct contact with the thermally sensitive metallization; a Schottky diode can therefore dissipate less power than an equivalent-size p–n counterpart with a deep-buried junction before failing (especially during reverse breakdown). The relative advantage of the lower forward voltage of Schottky diodes is diminished at higher forward currents, where the voltage drop is dominated by the series resistance.

== Reverse recovery time ==
The most important difference between the p–n diode and the Schottky diode is the reverse recovery time (t_{rr}) when the diode switches from the conducting to the non-conducting state. In a p–n diode, the reverse recovery time can be in the order of several microseconds to less than 100 ns for fast diodes, and it is mainly limited by the diffusion capacitance caused by minority carriers accumulated in the diffusion region during the conducting state. Schottky diodes are significantly faster since they are unipolar devices and their speed is only limited by the junction capacitance. The switching time is ~100 ps for the small-signal diodes, and up to tens of nanoseconds for special high-capacity power diodes. With p–n-junction switching, there is also a reverse recovery current, which in high-power semiconductors brings increased EMI noise. With Schottky diodes, switching is essentially "instantaneous" with only a slight capacitive loading, which is much less of a concern.

This "instantaneous" switching is not always the case. In higher voltage Schottky devices, in particular, the guard ring structure needed to control breakdown field geometry creates a parasitic p–n diode with the usual recovery time attributes. As long as this guard ring diode is not forward biased, it adds only capacitance. If the Schottky junction is driven hard enough however, the forward voltage eventually will bias both diodes forward and actual t_{rr} will be greatly impacted.

It is often said that the Schottky diode is a "majority carrier" semiconductor device. This means that if the semiconductor body is a doped n-type, only the n-type carriers (mobile electrons) play a significant role in the normal operation of the device. The majority carriers are quickly injected into the conduction band of the metal contact on the other side of the diode to become free moving electrons. Therefore, no slow random recombination of n and p-type carriers is involved, so that this diode can cease conduction faster than an ordinary p–n rectifier diode. This property, in turn, allows a smaller device area, which also makes for a faster transition. This is another reason why Schottky diodes are useful in switch-mode power converters: the high speed of the diode means that the circuit can operate at frequencies in the range 200 kHz to 2 MHz, allowing the use of small inductors and capacitors with greater efficiency than would be possible with other diode types. Small-area Schottky diodes are the heart of RF detectors and mixers, which often operate at frequencies up to 50 GHz.

== Limitations ==
The most evident limitations of Schottky diodes are their relatively low reverse voltage ratings, and their relatively high reverse leakage current. For silicon-metal Schottky diodes, the reverse voltage is typically 50 V or less. Some higher-voltage designs are available (200 V is considered a high reverse voltage). Reverse leakage current, since it increases with temperature, leads to a thermal instability issue. This often limits the useful reverse voltage to well below the actual rating.

While higher reverse voltages are achievable, they would present a higher forward voltage, comparable to other types of standard diodes. Such Schottky diodes would have no advantage unless great switching speed is required.

== Silicon carbide Schottky diode ==
Schottky diodes constructed from silicon carbide have a much lower reverse leakage current than silicon Schottky diodes, as well as higher forward voltage (about 1.4–1.8 V at 25 °C) and reverse voltage. As of 2011 they were available from manufacturers in variants up to 1700 V of reverse voltage.

Silicon carbide has a high thermal conductivity, and temperature has little influence on its switching and thermal characteristics. With special packaging, silicon carbide Schottky diodes can operate at junction temperatures of over 500 K (about 200 °C), which allows passive radiative cooling in aerospace applications.

== Applications ==
=== Voltage clamping ===
While standard silicon diodes have a forward voltage drop of about 0.7 V and germanium diodes 0.3 V, Schottky diodes' voltage drop at forward biases of around 1 mA is in the range of 0.15 V to 0.46 V (see the 1N5817 and 1N5711), which makes them useful in voltage clamping applications and prevention of transistor saturation. This is due to the higher current density in the Schottky diode.

=== Reverse current and discharge protection ===
The Schottky diode's low forward voltage drop is good for energy-efficient applications, because little energy is wasted to heat. This makes them useful as blocking diodes in stand-alone ("off-grid") photovoltaic (PV) systems which prevent batteries from discharging through the solar panels at night. They are also used in grid-connected systems with multiple strings connected in parallel, in order to prevent reverse current flowing from adjacent strings through shaded strings if the bypass diodes have failed.

=== Switched-mode power supplies ===
Schottky diodes are also used as rectifiers in switched-mode power supplies. The low forward voltage and fast recovery time leads to increased efficiency.

They can also be used in power supply "OR"ing circuits in products that have both an internal battery and a mains adapter input, or similar. However, the high reverse leakage current presents a problem in this case, as any high-impedance voltage sensing circuit (e.g., monitoring the battery voltage or detecting whether a mains adapter is present) will see the voltage from the other power source through the diode leakage.

=== Sample-and-hold circuits ===
Schottky diodes can be used in diode-bridge based sample and hold circuits. When compared to regular p–n junction based diode bridges, Schottky diodes can offer advantages. A forward-biased Schottky diode does not have any minority carrier charge storage. This allows them to switch more quickly than regular diodes, resulting in lower transition time from the sample to the hold step. The absence of minority carrier charge storage also results in a lower hold step or sampling error, resulting in a more accurate sample at the output.

=== Charge control ===
Due to its efficient electric field control, Schottky diodes can be used to accurately load or unload single electrons in semiconductor nanostructures such as quantum wells or quantum dots.

== Designation ==
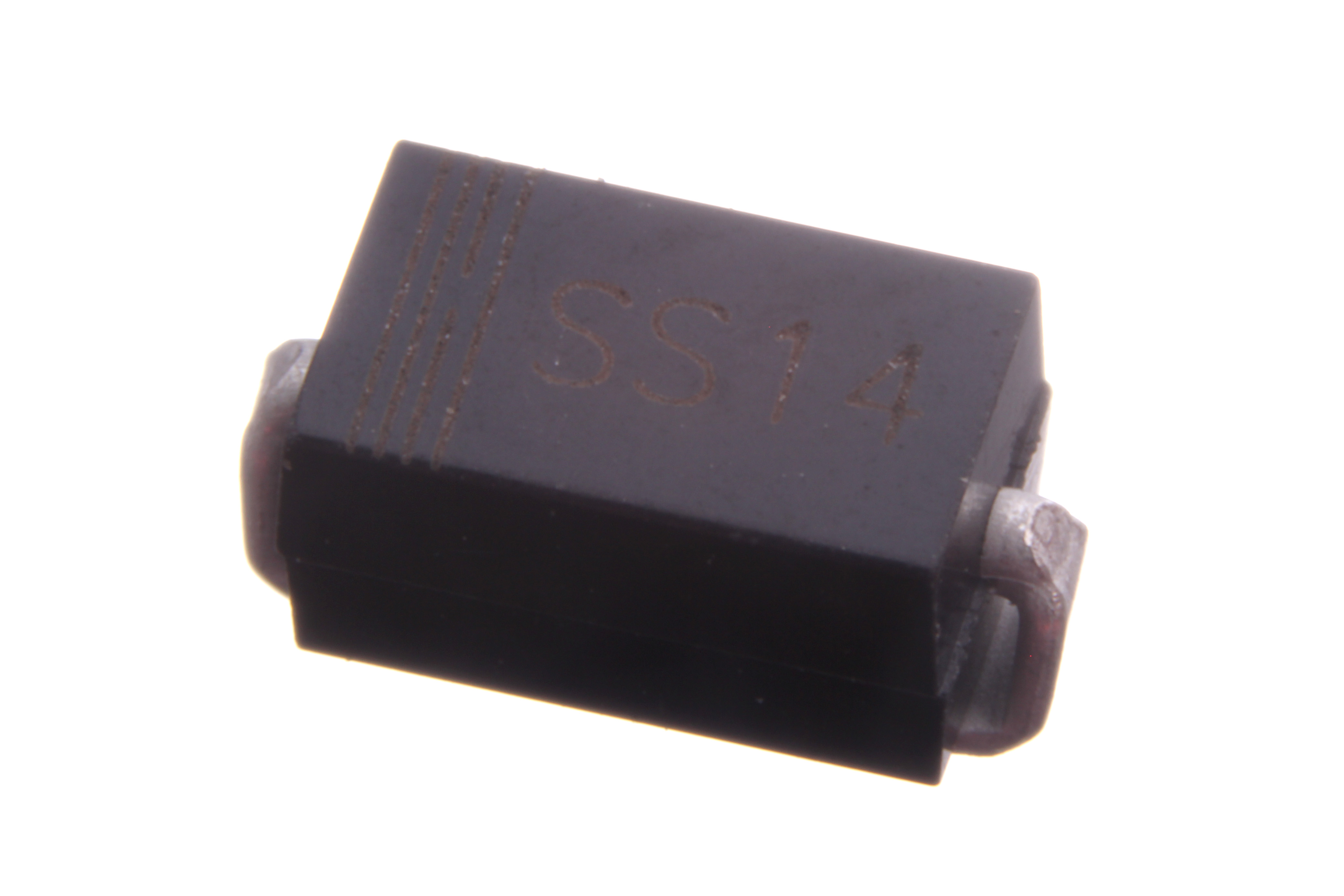
SS14 Schottky diode in a DO-214AC (SMA) package (surface mount version of 1N5819)

Commonly encountered Schottky diodes include the 1N58xx series rectifiers, such as the 1N581x (1 A) and 1N582x (3 A) through-hole parts, and the SS1x (1 A) and SS3x (3 A) surface-mount parts. Schottky rectifiers are available in numerous surface-mount package styles.

Small-signal Schottky diodes such as the 1N5711, 1N6263, 1SS106, 1SS108, and the BAT41–43, 45–49 series are widely used in high-frequency applications as detectors, mixers and nonlinear elements, and have superseded germanium diodes. They are also suitable for electrostatic discharge (ESD) protection of sensitive devices such as III-V-semiconductor devices, laser diodes and, to a lesser extent, exposed lines of CMOS circuitry.

Schottky metal–semiconductor junctions are featured in the successors to the 7400 TTL family of logic devices, the 74S, 74LS and 74ALS series, where they are employed as Baker clamps in parallel with the collector-base junctions of the bipolar transistors to prevent their saturation, thereby greatly reducing their turn-off delays.

== Alternatives ==
When less power dissipation is desired, a MOSFET and a control circuit can be used instead, in an operation mode known as active rectification.

A super diode, consisting of a pn-diode or Schottky diode and an operational amplifier, provides an almost perfect diode characteristic due to the effect of negative feedback, although its use is restricted to frequencies the operational amplifier used can handle.

== Electrowetting ==
Electrowetting can be observed when a Schottky diode is formed using a droplet of liquid metal, e.g. mercury, in contact with a semiconductor, e.g. silicon. Depending on the doping type and density in the semiconductor, the droplet spreading depends on the magnitude and sign of the voltage applied to the mercury droplet. This effect has been termed 'Schottky electrowetting'.

== See also ==
- Heterostructure barrier varactor – Semiconductor device with variable capacitance
- List of 1N58xx Schottky diodes – Schottky diodes
- Schottky effect – Phenomenon in condensed matter physics
