= Small Outline Diode =

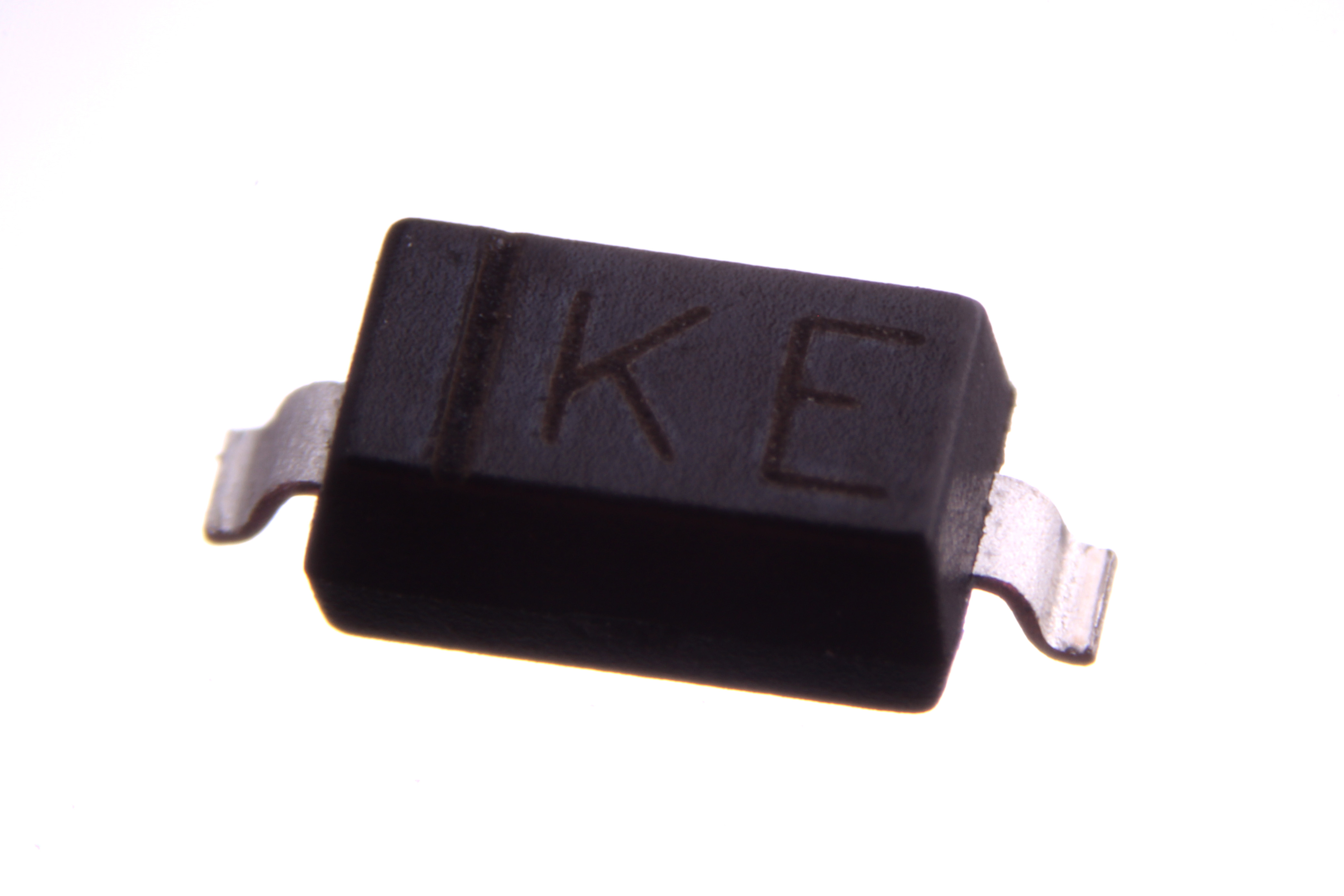
SOD-123 package

Small Outline Diode (SOD) is a designation for a group of semiconductor packages for surface mounted diodes. The standard includes multiple variants such as SOD-123, SOD-323, SOD-523 and SOD-923. SOD-123 is the largest, SOD-923 is the smallest.
