= DO-204 =

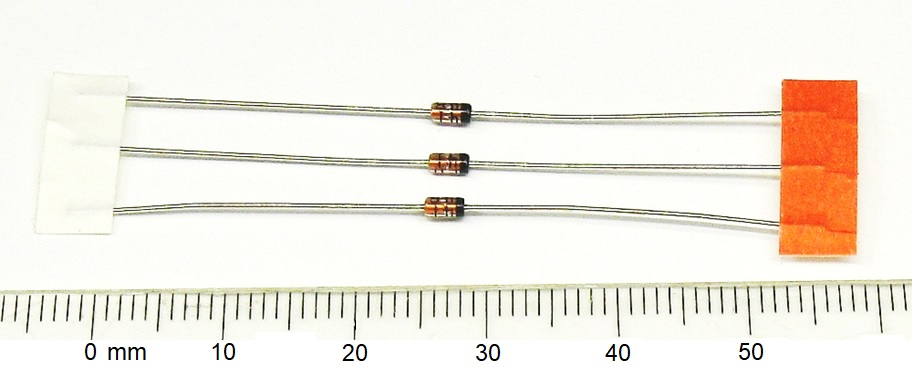
1N4148 axial diodes, in the glass DO-35 package (also known as DO-204-AH or SOD27)

DO-204 is a family of diode semiconductor packages defined by JEDEC. This family comprises lead-mounted axial devices with round leads. Generally a diode will have a line painted near the cathode end.

== Dimensions ==
General form of the packages described by DO-204. Lead diameter is not controlled less than E from the body to allow for minor irregularities.

Variants included in DO-204
Variant	Original standard	Dimensions (mm)									
Variant	Original standard	A		B		C		D		E	
Variant	Original standard	min	max	min	max	min	max	min	max	min	max
AA	DO-7	25.40	38.10	5.85	7.62	0.46	0.55	2.16	2.71	—	1.27
AB	DO-14	25.40	38.10	5.85	7.62	0.46	0.55	2.75	3.55	—	1.27
AC	DO-15	25.40	38.10	5.85	7.62	0.69	0.88	2.65	3.55	—	1.27
AD	DO-16	11.43	19.05	1.27	2.54	0.23	0.33	—	1.27	—	1.27
AE	DO-26	35.56	38.10	8.75	10.41	0.69	0.99	5.59	6.60	—	2.03
AF	DO-29	25.40	38.10	8.00	9.14	0.74	0.83	3.05	3.81	—	1.27
AG	DO-34	25.40	38.10	2.16	3.04	0.46	0.55	1.27	1.90	—	1.27
AH	DO-35	25.40	38.10	3.05	5.08	0.46	0.55	1.53	2.28	—	1.27
AJ	—	11.43	13.97	5.85	7.62	0.49	0.53	2.16	2.66	—	1.27
AK	—	11.43	13.97	3.81	4.45	0.36	0.40	1.66	1.90	—	1.27
AL	DO-41	25.40	—	4.07	5.20	0.72	0.86	2.04	2.71	—	1.27
AM	—	17.53	38.10	3.18	5.20	0.64	0.91	1.27	2.79	—	1.27
AN	—	25.40	—	5.08	5.84	0.71	0.86	2.54	3.05	—	1.27
AP	—	25.40	38.10	3.18	4.57	0.74	0.89	2.54	3.81	—	1.27
AR	—	27.95	38.10	9.27	9.52	1.22	1.32	6.10	6.35	—	2.54

== Common variants ==
A drawing of a DO-41 diode package. The cathode is marked with a silver or white band.

Several common packages are archived in DO-204 as variants, and may be referred to using their alternative names.

=== DO-7 ===
The DO-7 (also known as DO-204-AA) is a common semiconductor package for 1N34A germanium diodes.

=== DO-35 ===
The DO-35 (also known as DO-204-AH or SOD27) is a semiconductor package used to encapsulate signal diodes (i.e., diodes meant to handle small amounts of current and voltage). It is often used to package small signal, low power diodes such as 1N4148 (a 100 V, 300 mA silicon diode.)

=== DO-41 ===
The DO-41 (also known as DO-204-AL or SOD66) is a common semiconductor package used to encapsulate rectifier diodes (i.e., diodes meant to handle larger currents and voltages than signal diodes). The name is derived from the JEDEC descriptor "Diode Outline, Case Style 41". DO-41 diodes are larger than signal diode packages such as DO-35, which are not required to handle large currents. The most common diode using this packaging is the 1N4001 to 1N4007 series of rectification diodes.

== National standards ==
Standards organization	Standard	Designation for						
Standards organization	Standard	DO-7	DO-14	DO-15	DO-16	DO-29	DO-35	DO-41
JEDEC	JEP95	DO-204AA	DO-204AB	DO-204AC	DO-204AD	DO-204AF	DO-204AH	DO-204AL
IEC	IEC 60191	A1A	A1C	A58	A70	A71	A24	
DIN	DIN 41880	51A2				—	54A2	54B2
DIN	DIN 41883	—				56A2	—	—
EIAJ / JEITA	ED-7500A	SC-1A	—	SC-39	SC-54	SC-55	SC-40	—
British Standards	BS 3934	SO-6	SO-8				SO-84	
ASMW	TGL 200-8380	B	—	D5	D6	—	K	—
ASMW	TGL 11811	M3A	—	M3B	M3C	—	M2	—
