= 1N400x rectifier diodes =

Rectifier diodes

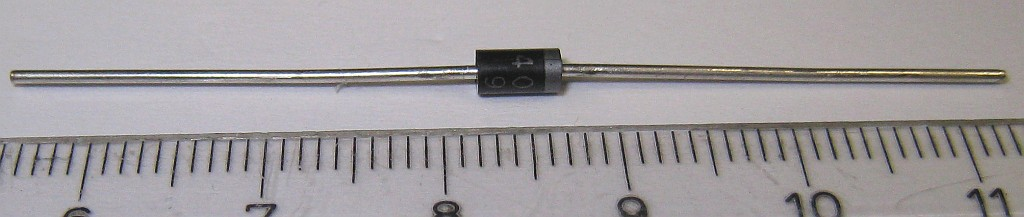
1N4001 diode in DO-41 axial package (through hole mount)

A schematic symbol for general-purpose silicon rectifier diodes

Current-voltage characteristics of a 1N4001 at different temperatures

The 1N400x (or 1N4001 or 1N4000) series is a family of popular one-ampere general-purpose silicon rectifier diodes commonly used in AC adapters for common household appliances. Its blocking voltage varies from 50 volts (1N4001) to 1000 volts (1N4007). This JEDEC device number series is available in the DO-41 axial package. Diodes with similar ratings are available in SMA and MELF surface mount packages (in other part number series).

The 1N540x (or 1N5400) series is a similarly popular family of diodes rated 3 Amperes, which has a larger DO-201AD axial package to dissipate heat better.

== History ==
The 1N400x series was originally introduced by Motorola's Semiconductor Products Division and registered at JEDEC in 1963 as silicon power rectifiers used primarily for military and industrial applications. It appeared in the Motorola Semiconductor Data Manual in 1965, as replacements for 1N2609 through 1N2617. The 1N540x series were announced in Electrical Design News in 1968, along with the now lesser-known 1.5 A 1N5391 series.

== Overview ==
These devices are widely used and recommended for general-purpose power-frequency rectifier use. They are commonly used as rectifiers in AC adapters of electrical appliances to convert AC to DC, and are also used in other types of power converters, or as freewheeling diodes to protect circuits from inductive loads.

These are fairly low-speed rectifier diodes, being inefficient for square waves of more than 15 kHz. They are not designed for switching applications; datasheets often do not specify any information on their turn-on and turn-off characteristics.

Compared with signal diodes, rectifier diodes generally have higher current ratings, can have much higher reverse voltage ratings, but have higher leakage current and greater junction capacitance.

The following table lists part numbers in the 1N400x, 1N540x, and other popular general-purpose silicon rectifier diode families.

Diode part numbers
| Voltage | Through-hole axial package | | | | | Surface-mount package | | | | | | |
| Voltage | 1 A (DO-41) | 1.5 A (DO-15) | 3 A (DO-201AD) | 6 A (R-6) | 10 A (R-6) | 1 A (MELF) | 3 A (MELF) | 1 A (SMA) | 1 A (SMA) | 2 A (SMB) | 3 A (SMC) | 5 A (SMC) |
|---|---|---|---|---|---|---|---|---|---|---|---|---|
| 50 Volt | 1N4001 | 1N5391 | 1N5400 | 6A05 | 10A05 | SM4001 | SM5400 | M1 | S1A | S2A | S3A | S5A |
| 100 Volt | 1N4002 | 1N5392 | 1N5401 | 6A1 | 10A1 | SM4002 | SM5401 | M2 | S1B | S2B | S3B | S5B |
| 200 Volt | 1N4003 | 1N5393 | 1N5402 | 6A2 | 10A2 | SM4003 | SM5402 | M3 | S1D | S2D | S3D | S5D |
| 400 Volt | 1N4004 | 1N5395 | 1N5404 | 6A4 | 10A4 | SM4004 | SM5404 | M4 | S1G | S2G | S3G | S5G |
| 600 Volt | 1N4005 | 1N5397 | 1N5406 | 6A6 | 10A6 | SM4005 | SM5406 | M5 | S1J | S2J | S3J | S5J |
| 800 Volt | 1N4006 | 1N5398 | 1N5407 | 6A8 | 10A8 | SM4006 | SM5407 | M6 | S1K | S2K | S3K | S5K |
| 1000 Volt | 1N4007 | 1N5399 | 1N5408 | 6A10 | 10A10 | SM4007 | SM5408 | M7 | S1M | S2M | S3M | S5M |
| Datasheet | | | | | | | | | | | | |

== See also ==
- 1N4148 signal diode
- 1N58xx Schottky diodes
- Diode bridge
- Flyback diode
