= Reverse leakage current =

Semiconductor flaw

Reverse leakage current in a semiconductor device is the current when the device is reverse biased.

Under reverse bias, an ideal semiconductor device should not conduct any current, however, due to attraction of dissimilar charges, the positive side of the voltage source draws free electrons (majority carriers in the n-region) away from the P-N junction. The flow of these electrons results in the creation of additional cations, thus widening the depletion region.

The widening of the depletion region serves as a barrier which blocks charge carriers from moving across the junction, except for the minute reverse leakage current, which is often on the order of 1 mA for Germanium diodes, and 1 μA for Silicon diodes.

The existence of this current is primarily facilitated by minority carriers arising from thermally generated electron hole pairs. This current increases with temperature, as more minority charges are produced, which is why temperature management is particularly important in bipolar transistors, although for most purposes leakage current is negligible and can be effectively ignored.

== See also ==
- Reverse saturation current, a more specific form of reverse leakage current
- P-N junction
