= DO-214 =

Semiconductor package size

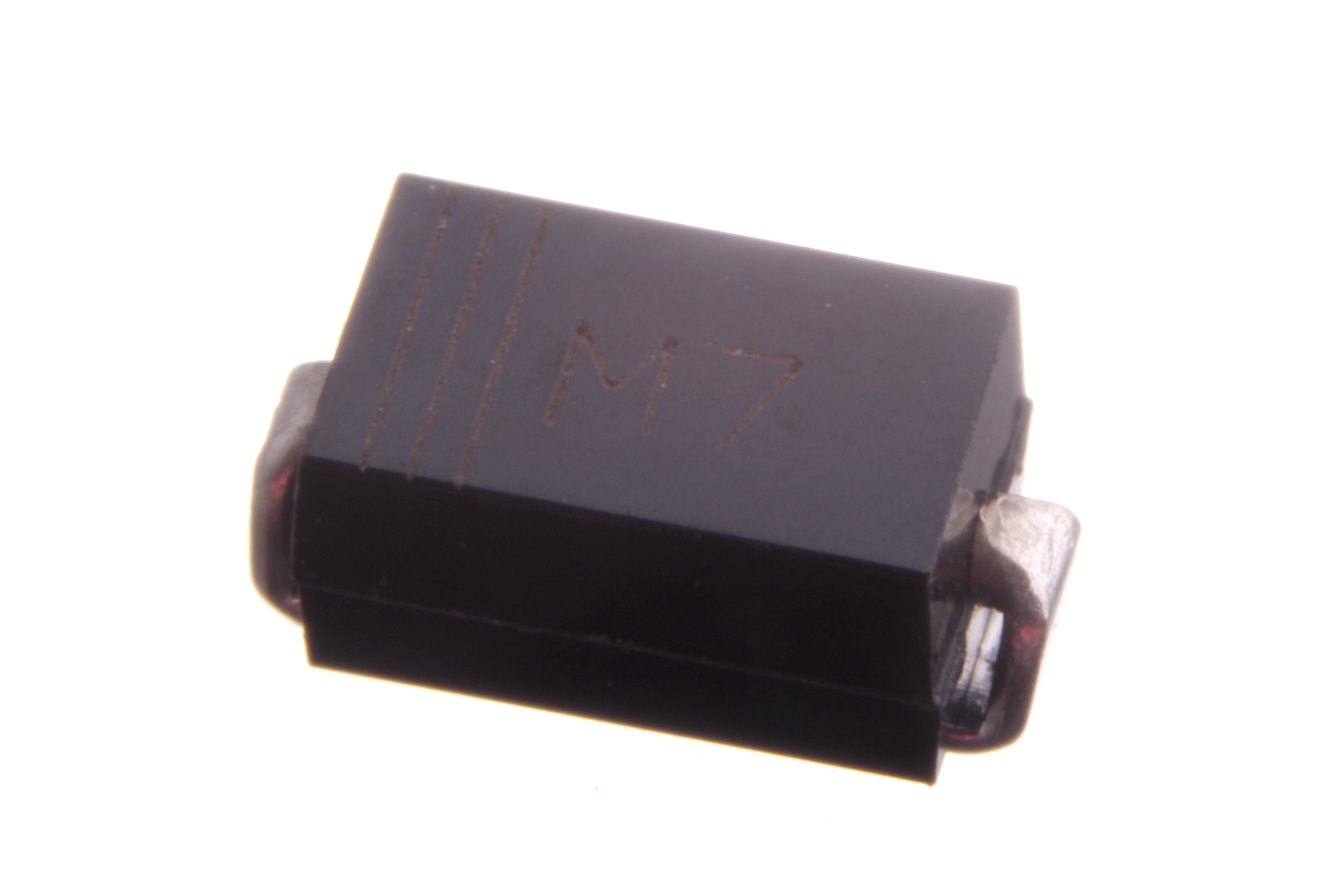
M7 general purpose diode in DO-214AC (SMA) package (surface mount version of 1N4007)

DO-214 is a standard that specifies a group of semiconductor packages for surface-mounted diodes. This includes Schottky diodes such as the SS34.

== Overview ==
The standard includes multiple package variants:

- DO-214AA, also known as SMB, is the middle size.
- DO-214AB, also known as SMC, is the largest size.
- DO-214AC, also known as SMA, is the smallest size.
- DO-214BA, also known as GF1
