= Metal electrode leadless face =

Device without any wire leads; vertical metal faces are used instead

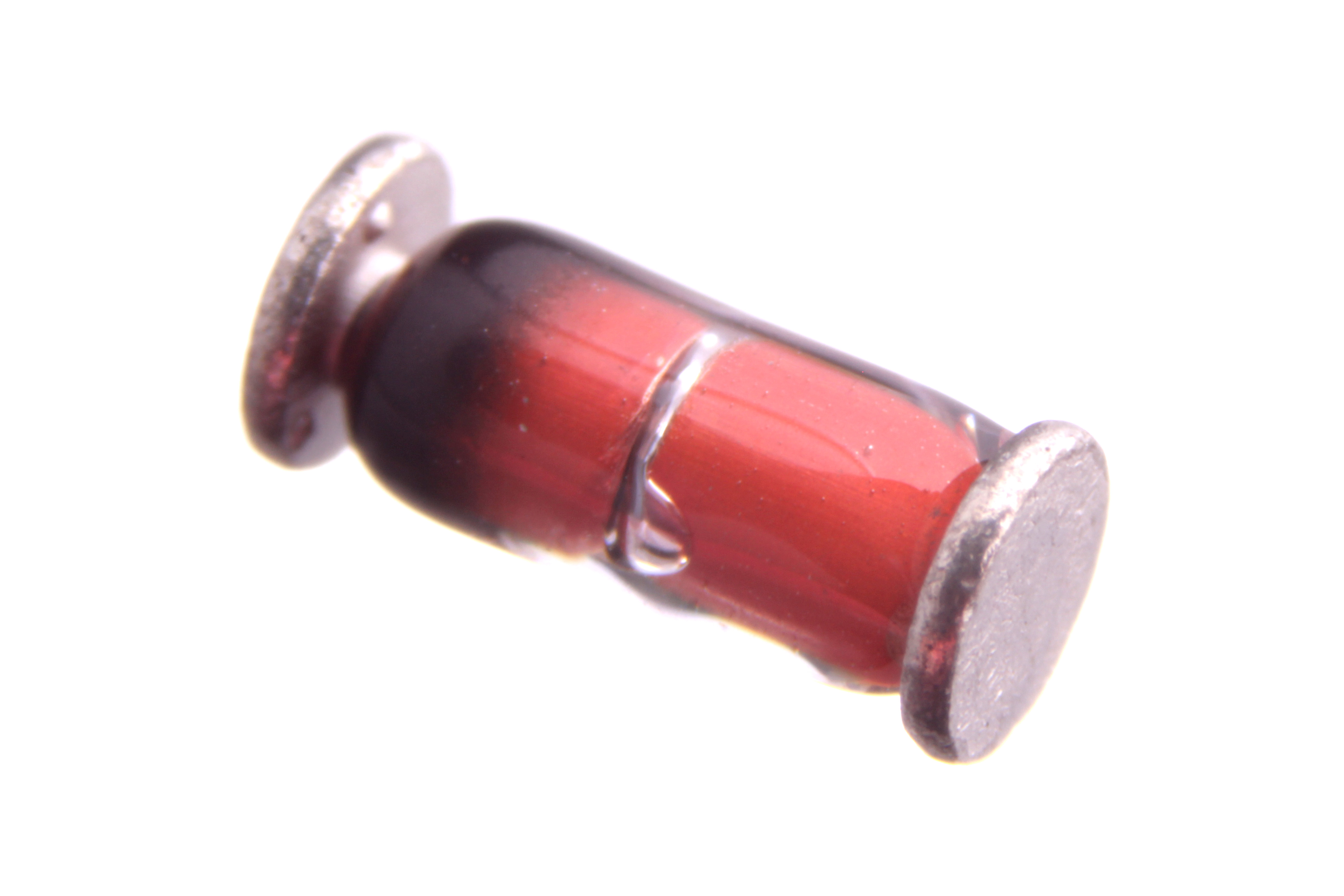
MiniMelf diode

Metal electrode leadless face (MELF) is a type of leadless cylindrical electronic surface mount device package with metal end terminals. Diodes and resistors are the most common MELF devices.

The EN 140401-803 and JEDEC DO-213 standards describe multiple MELF components.

Diode packages list
Title	SOD	DO	Size	Rating
MELF (MMB)	SOD-106	DO-213AB	L: 5.8 mm, ⌀: 2.2 mm 1.0 W	500 V
MiniMELF (MMA)	SOD-80	DO-213AA	L: 3.6 mm, ⌀: 1.4 mm 0.25 W	200 V
MicroMELF (MMU)			L: 2.2 mm, ⌀: 1.1 mm 0.2 W	100 V

== Handling difficulties ==
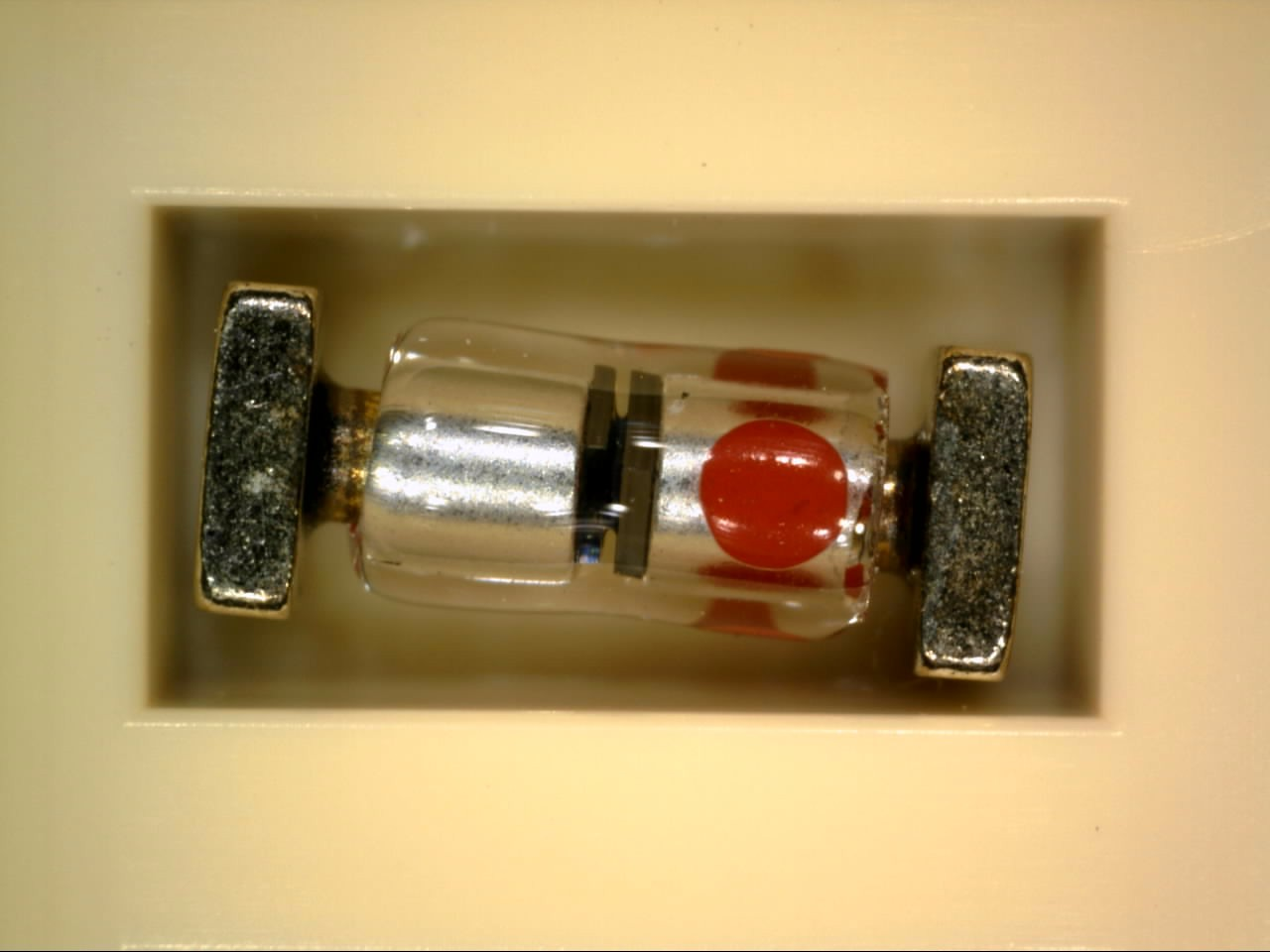
Zener diode for high-reliability applications in QuadroMELF package

Because of their cylindrical shape and small size, these components can roll off the workbench or circuit board before they have been soldered into place. As such, there is a joke which suggests an alternate meaning for the acronym: Most End up Lying on the Floor. They are sometimes called a "roll away" package.

During automated SMT pick-and-place, this happens mostly if the mechanical pressure of the SMD placer nozzle is too low. If the MELF components are placed into the solder paste with enough pressure, then this problem can be minimized. Care must be taken with glass diodes which are less mechanically robust than resistors and other MELF components.

Also, when building up PCBs via manual assembly using tweezers (e.g., for prototyping) then the pressure at the end of tweezers can often cause a MELF component to slip and shoot out the ends, thereby making their placement more difficult compared to flat component packages.

Another reason for the nickname of MELF components is that some production engineers do not like to use MELF nozzles on a SMT pick-and-place machine due to the time required to change from flat nozzles to MELF nozzles. For MICRO-MELF and MINI-MELF most SMD placers are able to use flat chip nozzles if the vacuum is high enough; i.e., higher than for flat chip components. For MELFs with the case size of 0207 or less, it is recommended to use the original MELF nozzle supplied with the SMT machine. Each supplier of such SMD pick-and-place machines offers these types of nozzles.

To overcome some of the difficulties encountered when mounting these devices, there are also variants with square electrodes (e.g. SQ MELF, QuadroMELF and B-MELF). These variants are mainly used in semiconductor diodes for applications where the high reliability of hermetically sealed voidless-glass packages is required.

These handling difficulties prompted development of alternative SMT packages for common MELF components (like diodes) where the power handling capability needed to be similar to MELF components (superior to low-power 0805/0603, etc. SMT components) but with improved automated pick-and-place handling characteristics. This resulted in various squared-off packages with fold-over contacts, similar to rectangular inductor/tantalum capacitor packages.

== Technical advantages ==
Despite their handling difficulties, and in the particular case of MELF resistors, they are still widely used in high-reliability and precision applications where their predictable characteristics (e.g., low failure rate with well-defined failure modes) as well as their higher performance in terms of accuracy, long-term stability, moisture resistance, high-temperature operation far outweigh their disadvantages.
