= Diamond buffer =

Electronic circuit

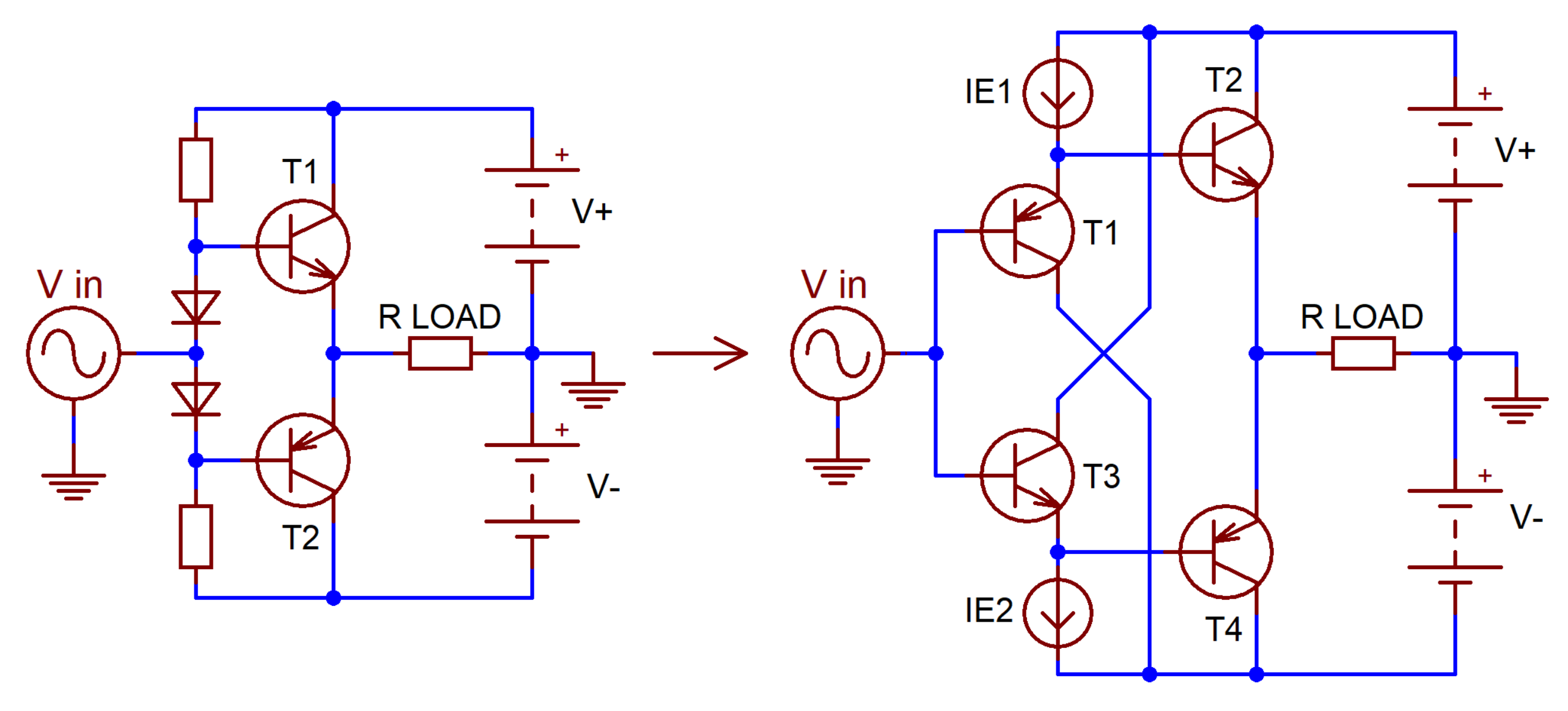
The basic diamond buffer (right) as the development of a diode-biased complementary emitter follower (left). Both circuits drawn to underscore the bridged topology of push-pull operation

The diamond buffer or diamond follower is a four-transistor, two-stage, push-pull, translinear emitter follower, or less commonly source follower, in which the input transistors are folded, or placed upside-down with respect to the output transistors. Like any unity buffer, the diamond buffer does not alter the phase and magnitude of input voltage signal; its primary purpose is to interface a high-impedance voltage source with a low-impedance, high-current load. Unlike the more common compound emitter follower (a "double" in audio engineering terms), where each input transistor drives the output transistor of the same polarity, each input transistor of a diamond buffer drives the output transistor of the opposite polarity. When the transistors operate in close thermal contact, the input transistors stabilize the idle current of the output pair, eliminating the need for a bias spreader.

The diamond buffer is used primarily in the input and output stages of high-speed current-feedback operational amplifiers. The circuit is also the essential building block of bipolar current conveyors, and has seen limited use in line-level audio preamplifiers and in the output stages of audio power amplifiers.

== Origins and applications ==
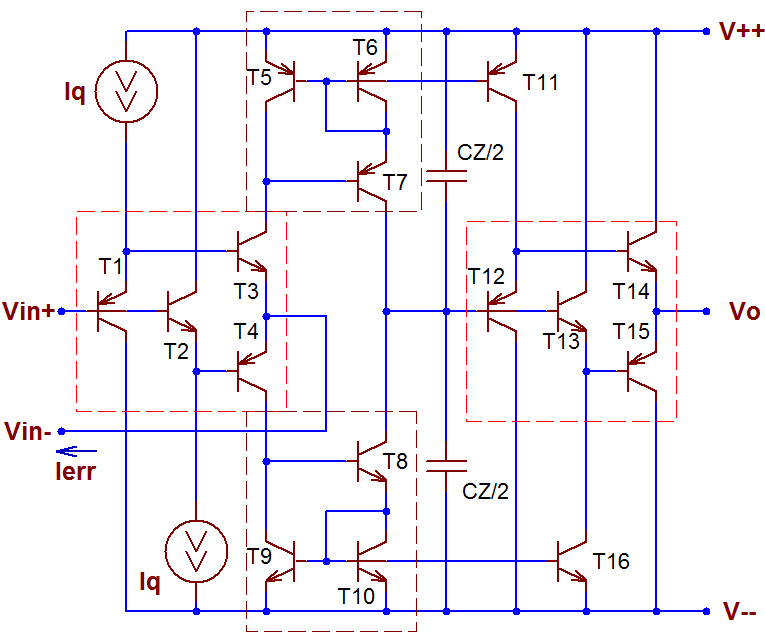
A simple current-feedback operational amplifier (CFOA) contains two diamond buffers (left and right dashed-line blocks).

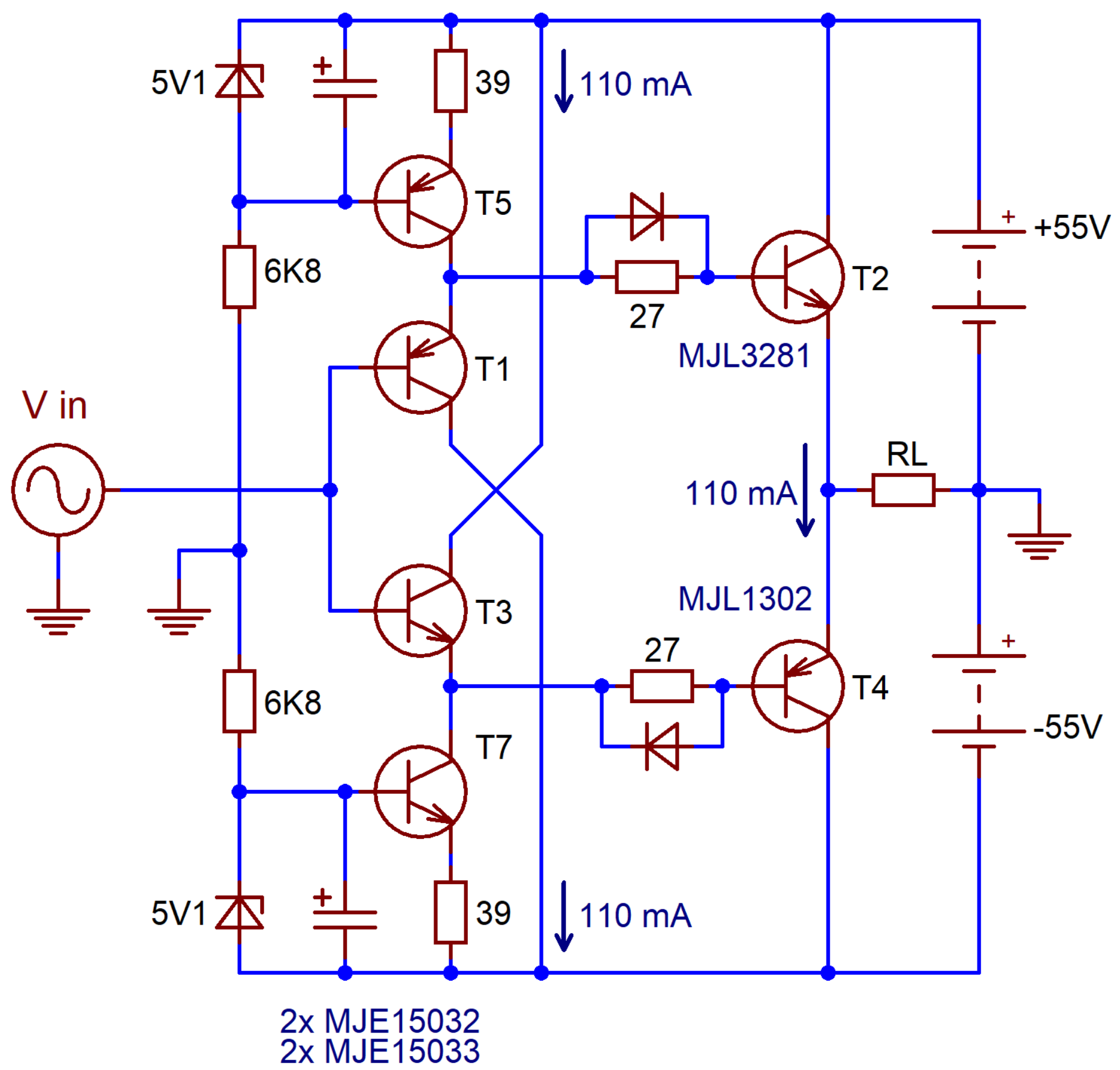
Each channel of the commercial Dartzeel audio power amplifier dissipates around 40 W idle power to be able to deliver 160 W through a simple four-transistor diamond

The diamond follower was a natural development of the complementary emitter follower with diode biasing. In 1971 Harris Corporation used it in the output stage of the HA-2600 monolithic operational amplifier. American press of the 1970s analyzed the HA-2600 in detail, but did not give its output stage a specific name The circuit remained uncommon, because early fabrication processes could not produce high-quality pnp transistors. The first dedicated diamond buffer circuit, the 30-MHz LH0002, was introduced by National Semiconductor in the late 1970s, and then described merely as "wide band, high current, unity gain buffer amplifier". By 1982, the LH0002 and similar discrete-transistor buffers were widely used in low-power (1 W or less) applications, particularly for video and instrumentation purposes.

A circuit identifiable as the diamond buffer appears in the discrete power output stage of the Jordan Professional 440 Solid State IC Amp Head, a guitar amplifier from 1970.

True high-speed integrated buffers became a reality only after the introduction of the silicon on insulator technology in the late 1980s, which led to the development of modern integrated current-feedback operational amplifiers (CFOA). Discrete and hybrid CFOAs were created by Comlinear Corporation in the early 1980s, but the first integrated CFOAs appeared only in 1987. The CFOA normally contains two diamond buffers. The input buffer converts differential input voltage into current; the output of this buffer serves as the inverting input of the complete CFOA. The current sourced or sunk at the inverting input is sensed by current mirrors inserted between the buffer and its power supply rails, and its mirrored copy is sourced or sunk into an internal high-impedance node. The resulting positive or negative voltage at this node is interfaced to the outside world with the output buffer. Traditional video buffer circuits using the diamond core (e.g. the 1986 Harris HA5033 or the 1993 Burr-Brown BUF634) were developed alongside the CFOAs.

Around 1990 the Burr-Brown Corporation used the term "diamond buffer" for their OPA660 IC and in related patents and application notes. A "diamond transistor", in Burr-Brown language, denoted a diamond buffer with an added high-impedance current-output stage. The marketing terms were adopted by audio amplifiers designers, despite ambiguity with the diamond cubic crystal structure, the hypothetical diamond transistors, and the "diamond differential" topology marketed by Sansui around 1980. In English-language academic literature, the diamond buffer has also been called "mixed translinear cell II" or MTC-II, to differentiate from the plain "mixed translinear cell" (another name for a diode-biased emitter follower). Outside of the anglosphere, the classic German textbook by Tietze and Schenck discusses the circuit as one of many forms of biasing the emitter follower, without giving it a specific name. Russian-language authors ambiguously call it the "linear parallel amplifier" or merely "parallel amplifier".

The diamond buffer was used in commercial audio line-level and headphone preamplifiers (e.g. the Lehmann Cube series and its clones), but did not see much use in commercial audio power amplifiers. The Accuphase current-feedback power amplifiers of the 1990s employed the diamond buffer in the input stage, but not the output stage. However, around 1982 the simple bootstrapped diamond buffer became commonplace on the DIY scene of the former Soviet Union, with improved designs continuing into the 21st century. In the 1990s the circuit was "rediscovered" by the designers of solid-state zero-feedback power amplifiers worldwide. A common zero-feedback design of that period used two diamond buffers for input and output stages, and a wideband step-up transformer for voltage gain. Less radical designs opted for the traditional common emitter or common cathode gain stage, which is sensitive to variations in load current. In such applications, according to Bob Cordell, a diamond buffer must be reinforced by at least one additional emitter follower stage, forming a so-called "diamond Triple", or even two stages ("diamond quad") to prevent distortion in the voltage amplification stage. Commercial high-power amplifiers like the Dartzeel 108 still use the most basic, four-transistor diamond output stage.

== Operation ==
Diamond followers with simple resistive current sources

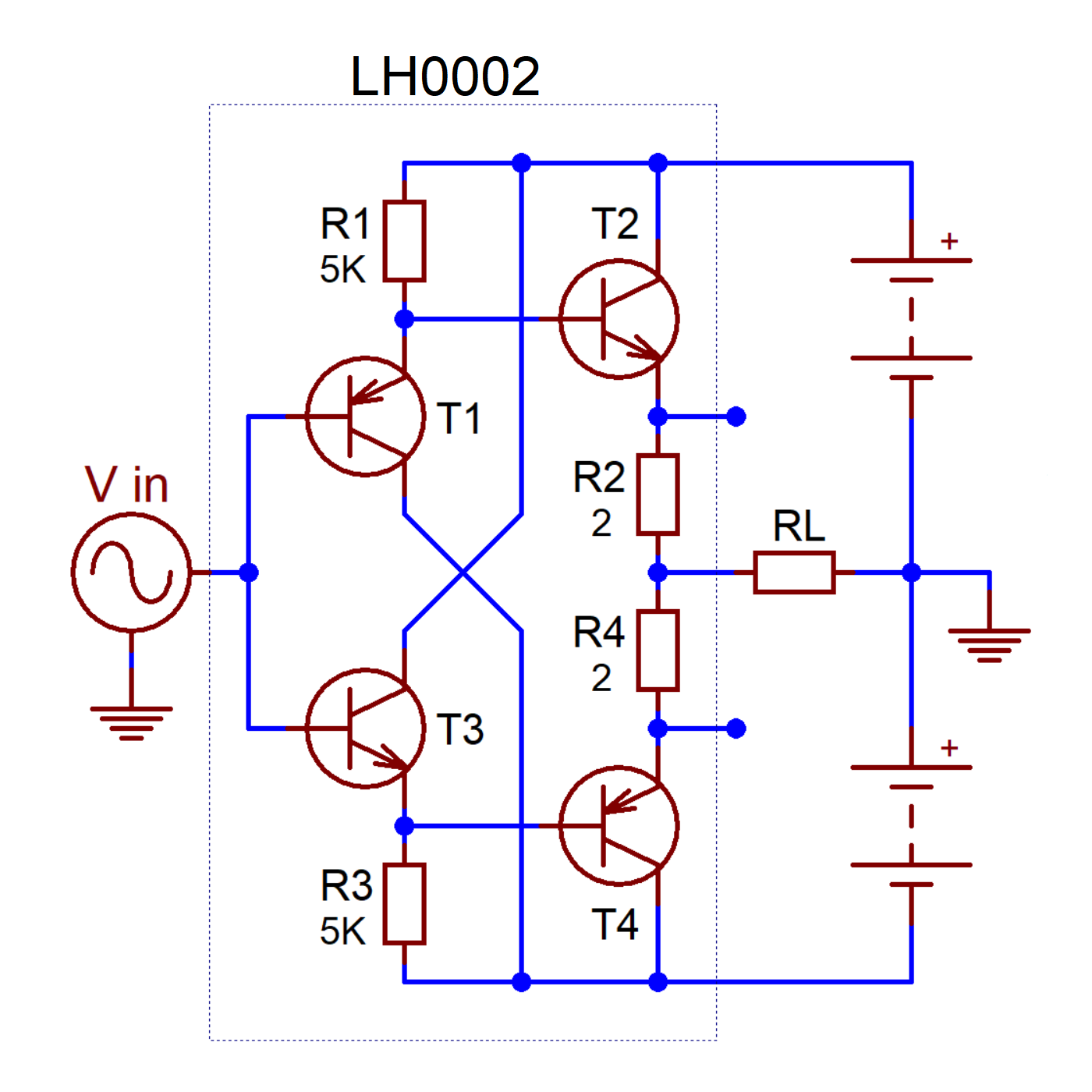
The original LH0002 schematic. Resistors R1, R3 source emitter currents into T1, T3. Emitter resistors R2, R4 set the current replication ratio and stabilize idle current of T2, T4. R2, R4 may be shorted if so desired

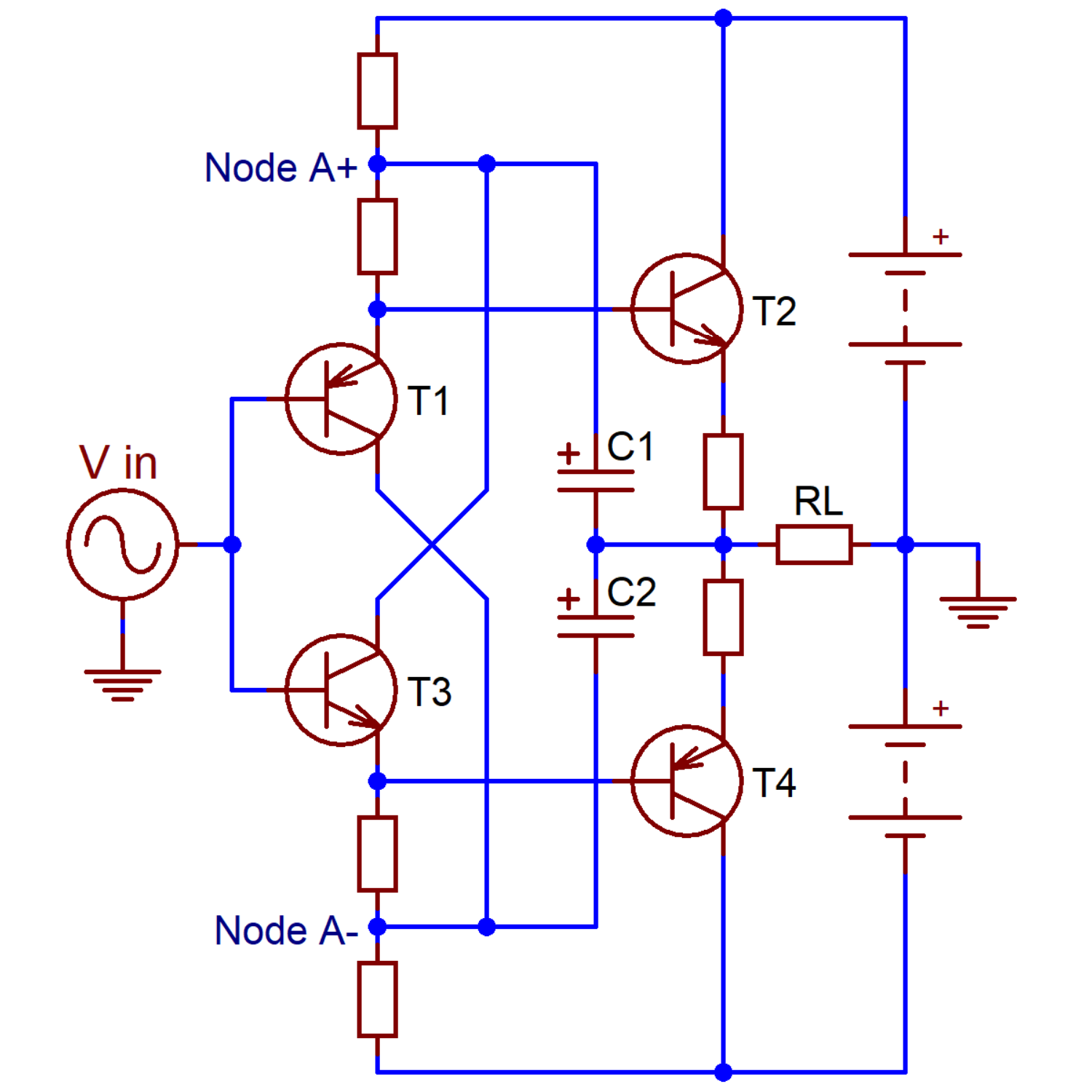
Bootstrapping emitters of T1, T3 increases maximum output current and voltage. Bootstrapping collectors as well removes the Early effect, and allows the use of low-voltage transistors in relatively high-voltage environments

The circuit is symmetrical, and therefore it may be analyzed by examining only the upper (T1, T2) or the lower (T3, T4) half. The two halves operate in parallel (hence the alternative name parallel amplifier). Each half consists of two simple emitter followers wired in series. Their combined current gain equals the product of npn and pnp current gains. Their combined voltage gain, like that of any emitter follower, is slightly less than unity. Exact value of voltage gain depends on load current and junction temperatures, as well as on the values of the emitter-to-load resistors (if any present; these resistors set idle current of the output transistors, improve stability and decrease the input-output phase difference while driving reactive loads). For purely resistive loads, gain slightly increases with input voltage, causing minor but non-negligible odd-order distortion. However, at high output currents voltage gain decreases due to the beta droop in the output transistors.

=== Operating point and thermal regulation ===
The four transistors form a translinear ring with a strong local feedback that ensures regulation of the DC operating point. If T1 and T2 have the same base-emitter junction areas and operate at the same junction temperature, then in absence of input voltage the current flowing through T1 is mirrored in the output stage. The current replication ratio may be altered by scaling the transistors, or by the insertion of degeneration resistors in series with the emitters, as was the case with the LH0002.

To ensure correct mirroring, T1 and T2 (as well as the opposite pair T3 and T4) must be placed on the die in close proximity or, in case of discrete devices, mounted on a common heatsink. In practice it is easier to couple power transistors "diagonally" - T1 to T4, and T3 to T2. Both collectors within each "diagonal" pair are connected to the same power supply rail, and do not need electrical insulation from each other.

=== DC offset ===
The base-emitter voltages of the two followers operating at equal currents, ideally, cancel each other out so the DC offset at the output is negligible. It is governed by the mismatch of pnp and npn transistors; in worst-case discrete-transistor circuits, without prior matching of the devices, it amounts to a few tens of millivolts. This allows parallel operation of multiple followers into a common load.

The offset may be practically nulled by augmenting each of the four transistors with a diode-wired transistor of the opposite polarity, e.g. wiring a pnp diode in series with the base-emitter junction of a pnp transistor, and vice versa. In practice this is rarely necessary, and the offset is either left alone, or suppressed with negative feedback, or isolated from the load with a coupling capacitor.

=== Clipping behaviour ===
Ordinary two-stage ("doubles") or three-stage ("triples") emitter followers clip when the instant input voltage approaches either positive or negative supply rail. Clipping due to current starvation of the output stage is not a concern because the preceding stages are almost always able to deliver the required currents into the bases of the output transistors, even when their beta droops at very high output currents. The diamond follower behaves differently, because the base currents of the output transistors (T2, T4) are limited by constant current sources (I_{e1}, I_{e2}). The same current sources also supply the collector-emitter currents of the input transistors (T1, T3).

Maximum output current into a low-impedance load is thus proportional to the idle current of the first stage: I_{out.max.sourced}=I_{e1}/β_{T2} or I_{out.max.sunk}=I_{e2}/β_{T4}. At either of these points (which are usually asymmetrical) the base of the respective output transistor intercepts all current available from the source, and the input transistor shuts down, causing abrupt clipping. Maximum output voltage depends on these current-handling limits in conjunction with the load impedance, and on the configuration of constant current sources. Simple resistive current sources, in particular, severely limit maximum currents and voltages. In discrete-transistor circuits, which allow the use of large-value capacitors, both can be improved by bootstrapping the current-setting resistors. Bootstrapping both emitter and collector potentials of T1 and T2 has the added effect of eliminating the Early effect and thus improving linearity. The bootstrapped diamond follower remains fully functional at DC, although the benefits of capacitive bootstrapping show up only at AC signals.

=== Linearity ===
Below the onset of clipping, total harmonic distortion (THD) depends on the combination of input voltage and output current. As is common to push-pull circuits, transition from pure class A operation into class AB causes significant crossover distortion. The nature and extent of class A/AB crossover in diamond buffers has been the subject of a debate in English-language audiophile press.

In absolute terms, the manufacturer of the LH002 specified open-loop THD of 0.1% at 5 V RMS output into a 50 Ohm load at ±12 V supply voltage (class AB). Designers of class AB zero-feedback hybrid audio power amplifiers employing the unmodified four-transistor output stage claimed THD of 0.1% at 3 kHz and 0.25% at 20 kHz. Designers of purely solid-state class AB amplifiers with global negative feedback claimed closed-loop THD of no more than 0.003% throughout the audio range.

Lowest distortion buffer amplifiers employ a combination of a voltage operational amplifier and an off-the-shelf diamond buffer IC, enclosed in a common negative feedback loop. According to Burr-Brown, this approach works well only at low frequencies (100 kHz or less for BUF634). At higher frequencies, internal resistance of the buffer rises with an inevitable increase in distortion. This can be remedied by paralleling multiple diamond buffers.

=== Slew rate ===
The slew rate (SR) of a simple diamond buffer is limited by I_{e1} at SR=I_{e1}/C_{int1}, where the internal capacitance C_{int1} is the total capacitance "seen" by the current source I_{e1} at the common node of the base of T2 and the emitter of T1 (or, in case of I_{e2}, at the common node of the base of T4 and the emitter of T3). For example, a 0.5 mA current source loaded into 10 pF node capacitance has SR of 50 V/μs. Negative and positive slew rates may be markedly asymmetrical. The power bandwidth for peak output voltage V_{p} is limited by the least of these two slew rates at F_{max}=SR/(2πV_{p}).

If the slew rate of the input signal exceeds the SR of the diamond buffer, the circuit may experience thermal runaway - a potentially destructive scenario when both T2 and T4 are conducting. The frequency that triggers thermal runaway for a given peak input voltage V_{p} is defined by the same formula as the power bandwidth, F_{max}=SR/(2πV_{p}).

== High output current derivatives ==
Clipping caused by current starvation of the input transistors is particularly pronounced in circuits with simple resistive "current sources", and in circuits where T2, T4 operate at fairly high current densities and thus exhibit strong beta droop. The use of electronic constant current sources and large-area, sustained-beta output transistors delays the onset of clipping, but does not change the pattern. An increase in idle currents allows a proportional increase in current handling, however, high idle currents invariably increase power consumption and heatsinking requirements. For example, each channel of a commercial Dartzeel 108 audio amplifier delivers up to 160 W into a 4 Ohm load from a simple unmodified diamond, at a cost of dissipating around 40 W idle power and weighing 15 kg. If efficiency and cost are critical, the circuit can be further improved for higher current handling at low idle currents.

High output current derivatives

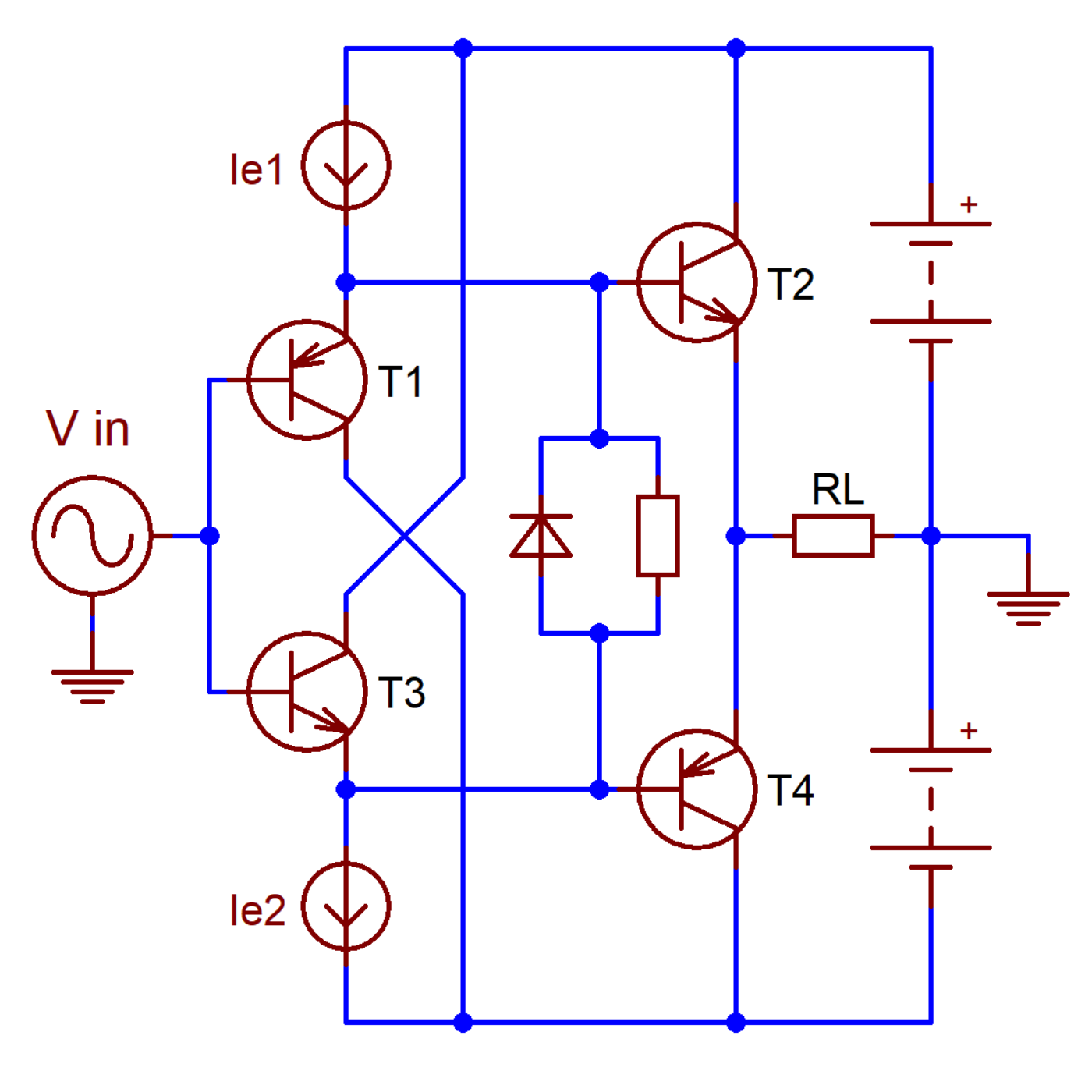
Reverse diode arrangement improves current handling at the cost of high crossover distortion

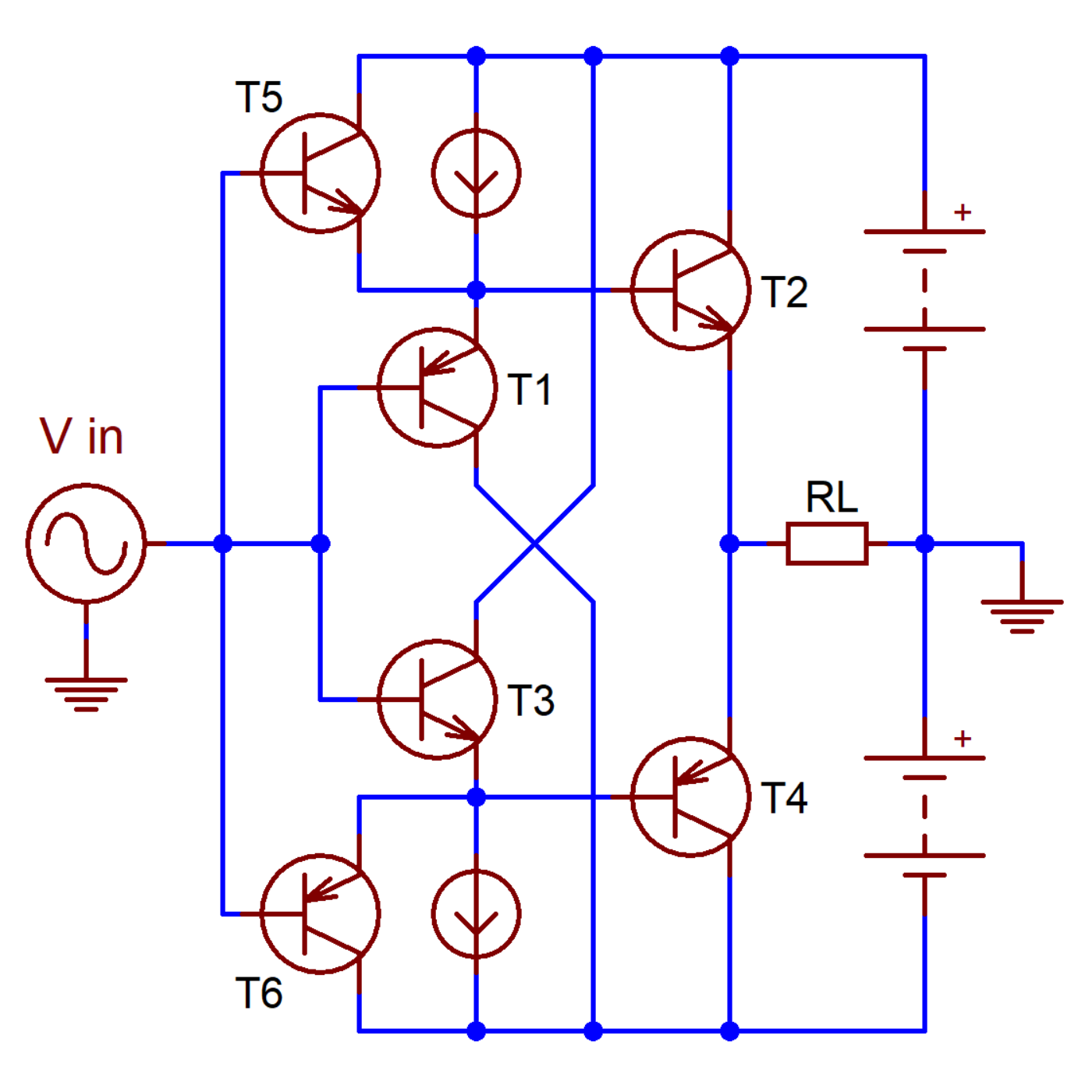
Hybrid follower with high (although nonlinear) slew rate

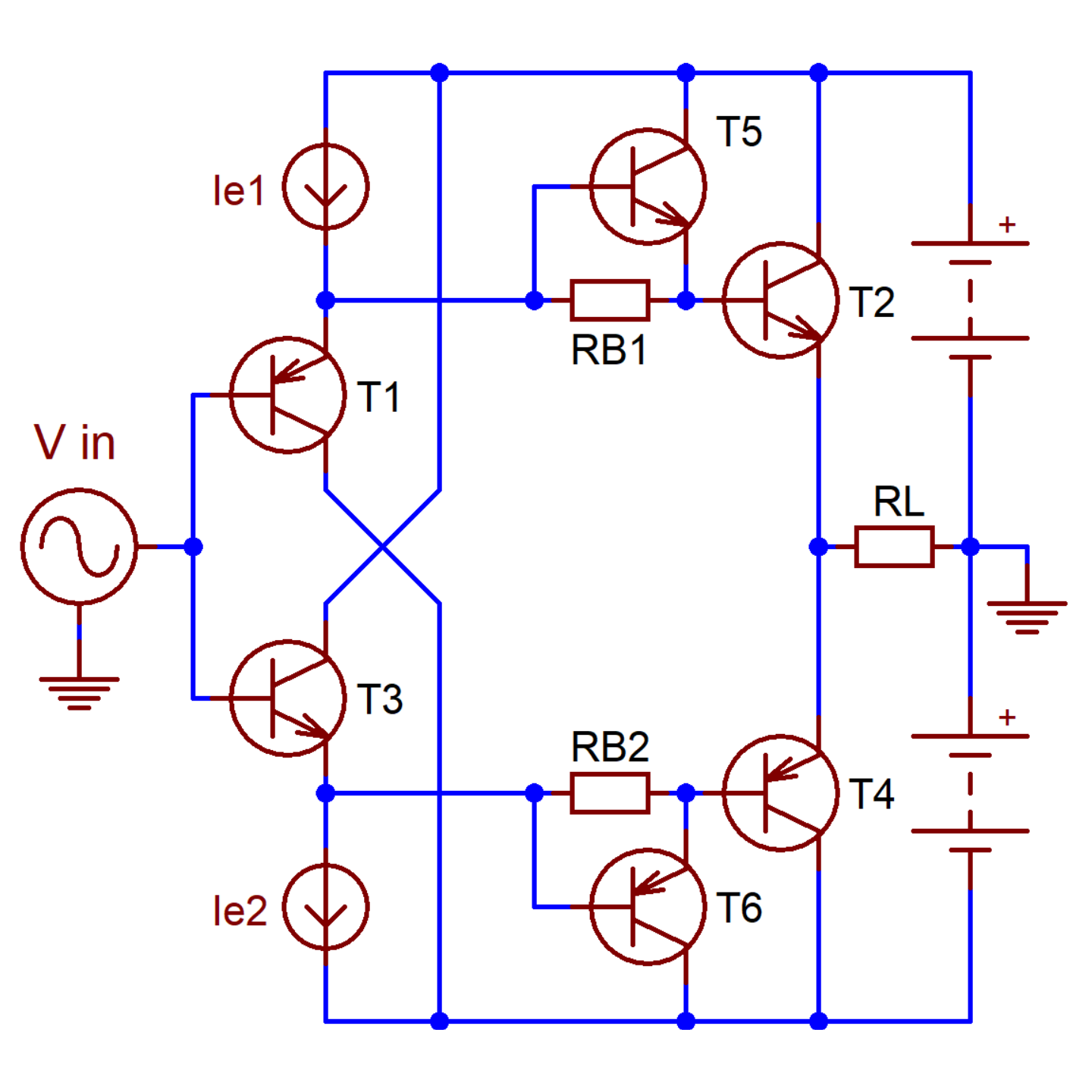
Hybrid follower with quasi-Darlington output transistors

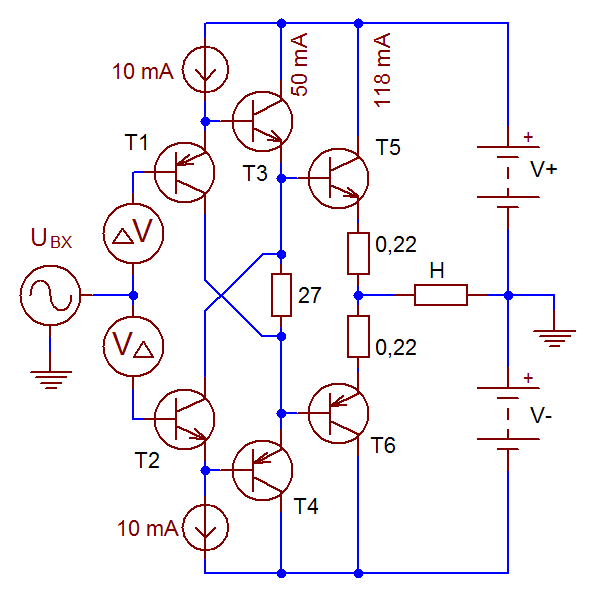
Folded "diamond buffer Triple" for audio requires bias spreader (ΔV) for thermal regulation

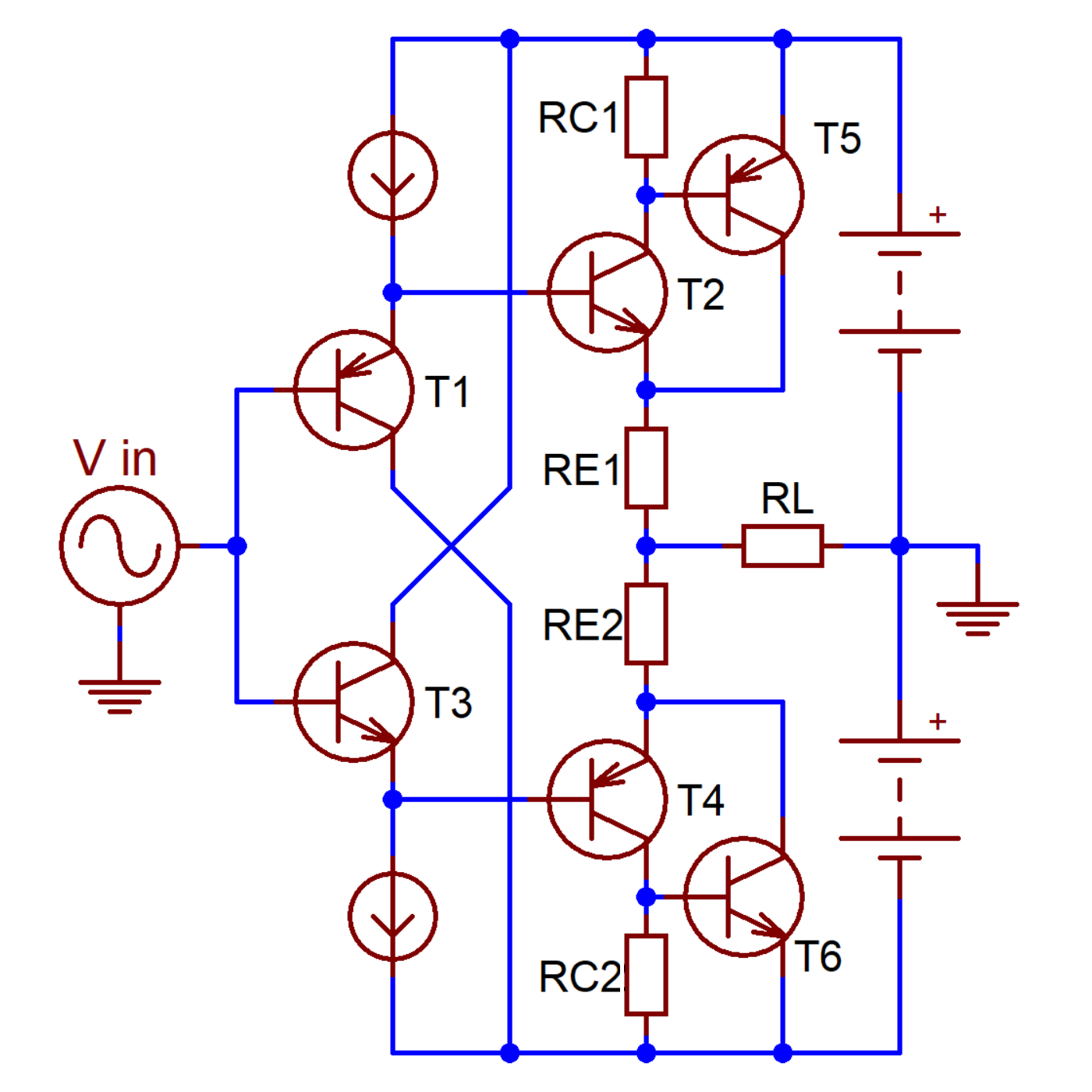
Diamond buffer with Sziklai (CFP) output pairs

In the simplest form, the circuit is augmented with a reverse diode connected to the bases of the output transistors. At high output currents the diode opens, and the diamond operates as a conventional two-stage emitter follower. The HA-2600 used a similar solution employing two reverse diodes, which connected the input node with the emitters of the output transistors. The transition between the two modes generates harsh crossover distortion. A less radical but linear approach suggests connecting a large-value capacitor between the bases of T2 and T4; the addition transforms T1, T3 into a true push-pull pair, doubling AC base current of the output stage.

A hybrid follower adds two simple emitter followers T5, T6 to the input stage. When the latter switches off, one of the added transistor provides the required base current to the output stage. The idea was used, for example, in the 1987 Burr-Brown OPA633 fast buffer IC. This circuit, too, suffers from crossover distortion. Slew rate at small input currents remains unchanged, but increases in a nonlinear, intermittent fashion when T5 or T6 engage. A follower built with small-signal transistors and drawing 1 mA idle current can easily attain high-level slew rate of 1000 V/μs. However, when input voltage decreases, slew rate abruptly drops to its much lower (low-level) natural value.

In a quasi-Darlington configuration, the added transistors T5, T6 sense the currents flowing from the current sources into the bases of output transistors T2, T4 and inject additional currents into their bases, thus preventing starvation of T1, T3. The arrangement is not a true Darlington circuit because T5, T6 engage only temporarily, at very high output currents. True Darlington outputs had also been proposed, albeit limited to class B operation.

Finally, the diamond buffer does not have to drive the load directly. The additional high-current transistors can be inserted between the buffer and the load, providing the required current reserve. In a "diamond buffer Triple" configuration the added transistors form a conventional emitter follower. The drawback is that the circuit requires its own bias spreader for thermal regulation. Emitter resistors in the output stage are not necessary for thermal stability, but are critical for minimizing crossover distortion. Least distortion is attained when the voltage drop across each emitter resistor at idle current equals the thermal voltage (26 mV at 300 K).

A simpler solution is to replace the output devices with two Sziklai pairs, which do not need the bias spreader and do not introduce significant thermal drift into the basic diamond structure. Transistor T1-T4 must be thermally coupled together, but T5 and T6 should be outside this thermal feedback loop. The idle currents of T3, T4 are regulated with purely electrical local feedback via emitter resistors Re1, Re2. Voltage across each resistor, again, should be set to 26 mV.
