= Sziklai =

Sziklai or Sziklay is a surname. Notable people with the surname include:

- Arnold Sziklay (fl. c. 1896), the first Hungarian filmmaker
- George Clifford Sziklai (1909–1998), Hungarian-American electronics engineer
  - Sziklai pair
- Johann Sziklai (born 1947), poet and teacher
