= Translinear circuit =

A translinear circuit is a circuit that carries out its function using the translinear principle. These are current-mode circuits that can be made using transistors that obey an exponential current-voltage characteristic—this includes bipolar junction transistors (BJTs) and CMOS transistors in weak inversion. Translinearity, in a broad sense, is linear dependence of transconductance on current, which occurs in components with exponential current-voltage relationship.

== History and etymology ==
The word translinear (TL) was invented by Barrie Gilbert in 1975 to describe circuits that used the exponential current-voltage relation of BJTs. By using this exponential relationship, this class of circuits can implement multiplication, amplification and power-law relationships. When Barrie Gilbert described this class of circuits he also described the translinear principle (TLP) which made the analysis of these circuits possible in a way that the simplified view of BJTs as linear current amplifiers did not allow. TLP was later extended to include other elements that obey an exponential current-voltage relationship (such as CMOS transistors in weak inversion).

== The Translinear Principle ==
The translinear principle (TLP) is that in a closed loop containing an even number of translinear elements (TEs) with an equal number of them arranged clockwise and counter-clockwise, the product of the currents through the clockwise TEs equals the product of the currents through the counter-clockwise TEs or $\,\! \prod_{n \epsilon CW}I_n = \prod_{n \epsilon CCW}I_n$

The TLP is dependent on the exponential current-voltage relationship of a circuit element. Thus, an ideal TE follows the relationship

$I=\lambda I_s e^{\eta V / U_T}$

where $I_s$ is a pre-exponential scaling current, $\lambda$ is a dimensionless multiplier to $I_s$, $\eta$ is a dimensionless multiplier to the gate-emitter voltage and $U_T$ is the thermal voltage $kT/q$.

In a circuit, TEs are described as either clockwise (CW) or counterclockwise (CCW). If the arrow on the emitter points clockwise, it is considered a CW TE, if it points counterclockwise, it is considered a CCW TE. Consider an example:

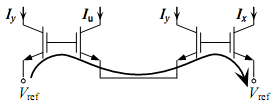
A circuit with a translinear loop

By Kirchhoff's voltage law, the voltage around the loop that goes from $V_{ref}$ to $V_{ref}$ must be 0. In other words, the voltage drops must equal the voltage increases. When a loop that only goes through the emitter-gate connections of TEs exists, we call it a translinear loop. Mathematically, this becomes

$\,\! \sum_{n \epsilon CW}V_n = \sum_{n \epsilon CCW}V_n$

Because of the exponential current-voltage relationship, this implies TLP:

$\,\! \prod_{n \epsilon CW}I_n = \prod_{n \epsilon CCW}I_n$

this is effectively because current is used as the signal. Because of this, voltage is the log of the signal and addition in the log domain is like multiplication of the original signal (i.e. $log(a) + log(b) = log(ab)$). The translinear principle is the rule that, in a translinear loop, the product of the currents through the CW TEs is equal to the product of the currents through the CCW TEs.

For a detailed derivation of the TLP, and physical interpretations of the parameters in the ideal TE law, please refer to or.

== Example Translinear Circuits ==
=== Squaring Circuit ===
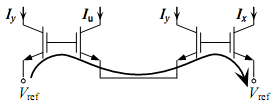
A TL squaring circuit using an alternating TL loop

According to TLP, $\,\! \prod_{n \epsilon CW}I_n = \prod_{n \epsilon CCW}I_n$. This means that $\,\! I_yI_y=I_xI_u$ where $I_u$ is the unit scaling current (i.e. the definition of unity for the circuit). This is effectively a squaring circuit where $\,\! I_x=I_y^2$. This particular circuit is designed in what is known as an alternating topology, which means that CW TEs alternate with CCW TEs. Here's the same circuit in a stacked topology.

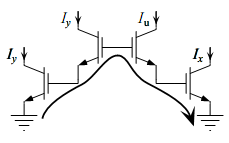
A TL squaring circuit using a stacked TL loop

The same equation applies to this circuit as to the alternating topology according to TLP. The alternating translinear loop is also called type A and the stacked loop called type B.

In realizing the principle the difficulty is that it is current based. The only voltage that is relevant to the principle is the voltage between the nodes N1 and N2. These and all other potentials must allow the transistors to carry the currents while forward biased in such a way that the transistors can follow the principle. What the nodes N1, N2 are depends on the type: For Type A the nodes are the emitter connections. For Type B the nodes are the connected bases of the upper BJT and the emitters of the lower.

For every pair of base connected transistors only one may have its collector connected to its base in diode connection and the input current set by the collector potential but the other may not be biased in the same way.

Both type A and B realize the same mathematical function with the difference being the voltage between the two nodes of which at least one is an emitter to emitter connection. For type A (alternating), with two emitter connected pairs, the voltage relates to the ratio between the currents within each base coupled pair. For type B (stacked/balanced), the node voltage is the sum of the two base emitter voltages in each pair and thus relates to the product of currents in each stacked base to emitter coupled pair. Thus if the voltage is forced in either case, two currents, one in each pair, must be variable.

In the type A (alternating loop) example below, a NMOSFET allows the correct tiny voltage between the emitter nodes of the emitter coupled pairs due to negative feedback, because a higher collector/gate voltage lowers its resistance such that, the base emitter voltage of the output BJT is small enough to let it out of saturation.

The collector potential of one of the inner BJT controls both the inner BJT's current by allowing the inner two BJTs to drop their emitter currents through the low residual voltage of the NMOSFET.

As the MOSFET should not operate in reverse drain source polarity this restricts the current relations or emitter potentials that the circuit can operate at.

Here are some example biasing schemes:

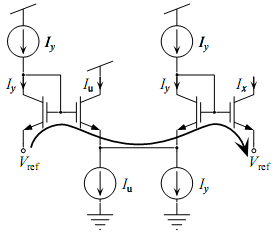
A biasing scheme for the alternating squaring circuit using diode connections.

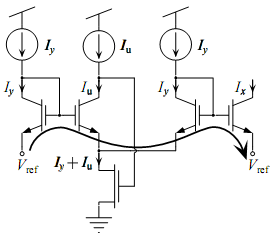
A biasing scheme for the alternating squaring circuit using diode connections and a feedback connection between the collector and emitter of the TE (EP connection).

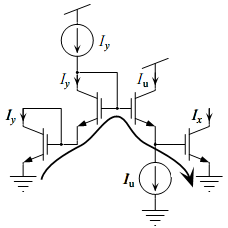
A biasing scheme for the stacked squaring circuit using diode connections and an EP connection.

=== 2-Quadrant Multiplier ===
The design of a 2-quadrant multiplier can be easily done using TLP. The first issue with this circuit is that negative values of currents need to be represented. Since all currents must be positive for the exponential relationship to hold (the log operation is not defined for negative numbers), positive currents must represent negative currents. The way this is done is by defining two positive currents whose difference is the current of interest.

A two quadrant multiplier has the relationship $\,\! z=xy$ hold while allowing $\,\! x$ to be either positive or negative. We'll let $\,\! z=z^+-z^-$ and $\,\! x=x^+-x^-$. Also note that $\,\! x=I_x/I_u$ and $\,\! x^+=I_x^+/I_u$ etc. Plugging these values into the original equation yields $\,\! \left(\frac{I_z^+}{I_u}-\frac{I_z^-}{I_u}\right)=\left(\frac{I_x^+}{I_u}-\frac{I_x^-}{I_u}\right)\left(\frac{I_y}{I_u}\right)$. This can be rephrased as $\,\! (I_z^+I_u-I_z^-I_u)=(I_x^+-I_x^-)(I_y)$. By equating the positive and negative portions of the equation, two equations that can be directly built as translinear loops arise:

$I_yI_x^+=I_uI_z^+$

$I_yI_x^-=I_uI_z^-$

The following are the alternating loops that implement the desired equations and some biasing schemes for the circuit.

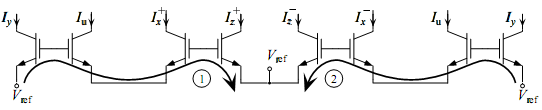
The translinear loops that implement our desired equations.

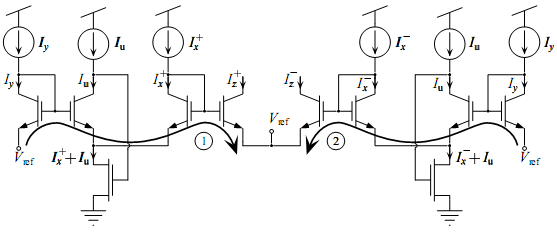
A biasing scheme for the alternating TL two-quadrant multiplier circuit using diode connections and an EP connection.

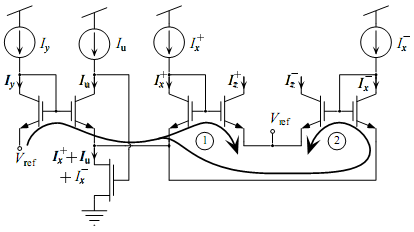
A biasing scheme that consolidates some current sources.

== Usage in electronic circuits ==
The TLP has been used in a variety of circuits including vector arithmetic circuits, current conveyors, current-mode operational amplifiers, and RMS-DC converters. It has been in use since the 1960s (by Gilbert), but was not formalized until 1975. In the 1980s, Evert Seevinck's work helped to create a systematic process for translinear circuit design. In 1990 Seevinck invented a circuit he called a companding current-mode integrator that was effectively a first-order log-domain filter. A version of this was generalized in 1993 by Douglas Frey and the connection between this class of filters and TL circuits was made most explicit in the late 90s work of Jan Mulder et al. where they describe the dynamic translinear principle. More work by Seevinck led to synthesis techniques for extremely low-power TL circuits. More recent work in the field has led to the voltage-translinear principle, multiple-input translinear element networks, and field-programmable analog arrays (FPAAs).
