= Barrie Gilbert =

English-American inventor (1937–2020)

Barrie Gilbert (5 June 1937 – 30 January 2020) was an English-American electrical engineer. He was well known for his invention of numerous analog circuit concepts, holding over 100 patents worldwide, and for the discovery of the Translinear Principle. His name is attributed to a class of related topologies loosely referred to as the Gilbert cell, one of which is a mixer - a key frequency translation device - used in every modern wireless communication device. A similar topology, for use as a synchronous demodulator, was invented by Howard Jones in 1963.

Gilbert was born in Bournemouth, England. During the 1950s he pursued an interest in solid-state devices while at Mullard, working on the development of early transistors, and later, the first-generation planar ICs. After some pioneering development of sampling oscillography he emigrated to the United States in 1964 to pursue this interest at Tektronix, Beaverton, Oregon, where he developed the first electronic knob-readout system and other advances in instrumentation. He returned to England in 1970, where he was Group Leader at Plessey Research Laboratories, managing a team developing OCR systems and integrated circuits (ICs) for communications applications. From 1972-1977 he consulted for Analog Devices Inc., Wilmington, MA, designing several ICs embodying novel nonlinear concepts. He returned to the USA and Tektronix in 1977 to pursue HF ICs and process development.

In 1979, Analog Devices allowed Gilbert to create the first remote design center for the Company, in Oregon, to persuade him to rejoin the company as their first Fellow. This center developed into the Northwest Labs.

On February 4, 2020, Analog Devices announced that Gilbert had died.

== Awards and honors ==
In 1984, Gilbert became a Life Fellow of the Institute of Electrical and Electronics Engineers (IEEE) for discovery of the translinear principle and invention of the translinear multiplier. For pioneering work on merged logic, he received the IEEE "Outstanding Achievement Award" (1970) and later the IEEE Solid-State Circuits Council "Outstanding Development Award" (1986). He was Oregon Researcher of the Year in 1990 and he received the IEEE Solid-State Circuits Award (1992) "For contributions to non-linear analog signal processing circuits". He has five times received the ISSCC Outstanding Paper Award. He held an Honorary Doctorate from Oregon State University. In 2009, Gilbert was elected to the U.S. National Academy of Engineering.
