= Current conveyor =

A current conveyor (CC) is an abstraction for a three-terminal analogue electronic device. It is a form of electronic amplifier with unity gain. There are three versions of generations of the idealised device, CCI, CCII and CCIII. When configured with other circuit elements, real current conveyors can perform many analog signal processing functions, in a similar manner to the way op-amps and the ideal concept of the op-amp are used.

== History ==
When Sedra and Smith first introduced the current conveyor in 1968, it was not clear what the benefits of the concept would be. The idea of the op-amp had been well known since the 1940s, and integrated circuit manufacturers were better able to capitalise on this widespread knowledge within the electronics industry. Monolithic current conveyor implementations were not introduced, and the op-amp became widely implemented. Since the early 2000s, implementations of the current conveyor concept, especially within larger VLSI projects such as mobile phones, have proved worthwhile.

== Advantages ==
Current conveyors can provide better gain-bandwidth products than comparable op-amps, under both small and large signal conditions. In instrumentation amplifiers, their gain does not depend on matching pairs of external components, only on the absolute value of a single circuit element.

== First generation (CCI) ==
The CCI is a three-terminal device with the terminals designated X, Y, and Z. The potential at X equals whatever voltage is applied to Y. Whatever current flows into Y also flows into X, and is mirrored at Z with a high output impedance, as a variable constant current source. In sub-type CCI+, current into Y produces current into Z; in a CCI-, current into Y results in an equivalent current flowing out of Z.

== Second generation (CCII) ==
In a more versatile later design, no current flows through terminal Y. The ideal CCII can be seen as an ideal transistor with perfected characteristics. No current flows into the gate or base which is represented by Y. There is no base-emitter or gate-source voltage drop, so the emitter or source voltage (at X) follows the voltage at Y. The gate or base has an infinite input impedance (Y), while the emitter or source has a zero input impedance (X). Any current out of the emitter or source (X) is reflected at the collector or drain (Z) as a current in, but with an infinite output impedance. Because of this reversal of sense between X and Z currents, this ideal bipolar or field-effect transistor represents a CCII−. If current flowing out of X resulted in the same high-impedance current flowing out of Z, it would be a CCII+.

== Third generation (CCIII) ==
The third configuration of the current conveyor is similar to the CCI except that the current in X is reversed, so in a CCIII whatever current flows into Y also flows out of X.

== See also ==
- List of linear integrated circuits
