= Large-signal model =

Large-signal modeling is a common analysis method used in electronic engineering to describe nonlinear devices in terms of the underlying nonlinear equations. In circuits containing nonlinear elements such as transistors, diodes, and vacuum tubes, under "large signal conditions", AC signals have high enough magnitude that nonlinear effects must be considered.

"Large signal" is the opposite of "small signal". Small signal means that the circuit can be reduced to a linearized equivalent circuit around its operating point with sufficient accuracy.

== Differences between Small Signal and Large Signal ==
A small signal model takes a circuit and based on an operating point (bias) and linearizes all the components. Nothing changes because the assumption is that the signal is so small that the operating point (gain, capacitance, etc.) doesn't change.

A large signal model, on the other hand, takes into account the fact that the large signal actually affects the operating point, as well as that elements are non-linear and circuits can be limited by power supply values to avoid variation in operating point. A small signal model ignores simultaneous variations in the gain and supply values.

== See also ==
- Diode modelling
- Transistor models#Large-signal nonlinear models
