= Rubber diode =

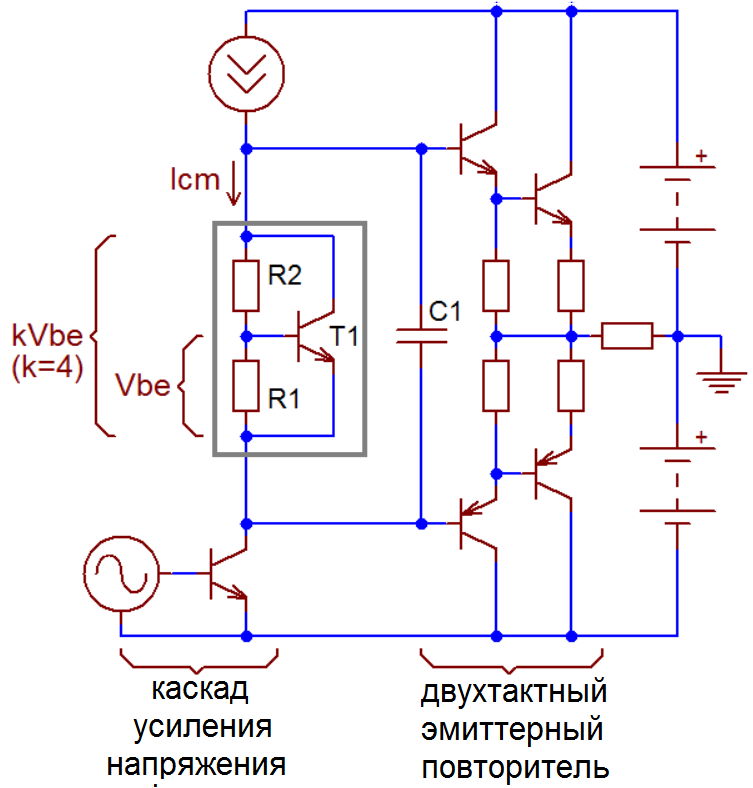
V_{BE} multiplier (inside grey box) used in push-pull amplifier biasing

In electronics, a rubber diode or V_{BE} multiplier is a bipolar junction transistor circuit that serves as a voltage reference. It consists of one transistor and two resistors, and the reference voltage across the circuit is determined by the selected resistor values and the base-to-emitter voltage (V_{BE}) of the transistor. The circuit behaves as a voltage divider, but with the voltage across the base-emitter resistor determined by the forward base-emitter junction voltage.

It is commonly used in the biasing of push-pull output stages of amplifiers, where one benefit is thermal compensation: The temperature-dependent variations in the multiplier's V_{BE}, approximately -2.2 mV/°C, can be made to match variations occurring in the V_{BE} of the power transistors by mounting to the same heat sink. In this context, it is sometimes called bias servo.
