= George Clifford Sziklai =

- Born: July 9, 1909; Budapest, Hungary
- Died: September 9, 1998 (aged 89); Los Altos Hills, California, United States
- Occupations: Inventor, Electrical Engineer

George Clifford Sziklai (July 9, 1909 – September 9, 1998) was a Hungarian-American renowned electronics engineer, who among many other contributions to radio and TV electronics invented the transistor configuration named after him, the Sziklai pair.

Educated at the University of Budapest and the Technical University of Munich, Sziklai immigrated to New York in 1930. His long career included stations at Radio Corporation of America and Westinghouse Electric Corporation before he joined Lockheed's Palo Alto Research Laboratory in 1967.

Sziklai, who held some 160 patents including color television transmission, is also credited with constructing the first Image Orthicon television camera
