= Darlington transistor =

Multi-transistor electronics configuration

Darlington Transistor (NPN-type)

In electronics, a Darlington configuration (commonly called as a Darlington pair) is a circuit consisting of two bipolar transistors with the emitter of one transistor connected to the base of the other, such that the current amplified by the first transistor is amplified further by the second one. The collectors of both transistors are connected together. This configuration has a much higher current gain than each transistor taken separately. It acts like and is often packaged as a single transistor. It was invented in 1953 by Sidney Darlington.

== Behavior ==
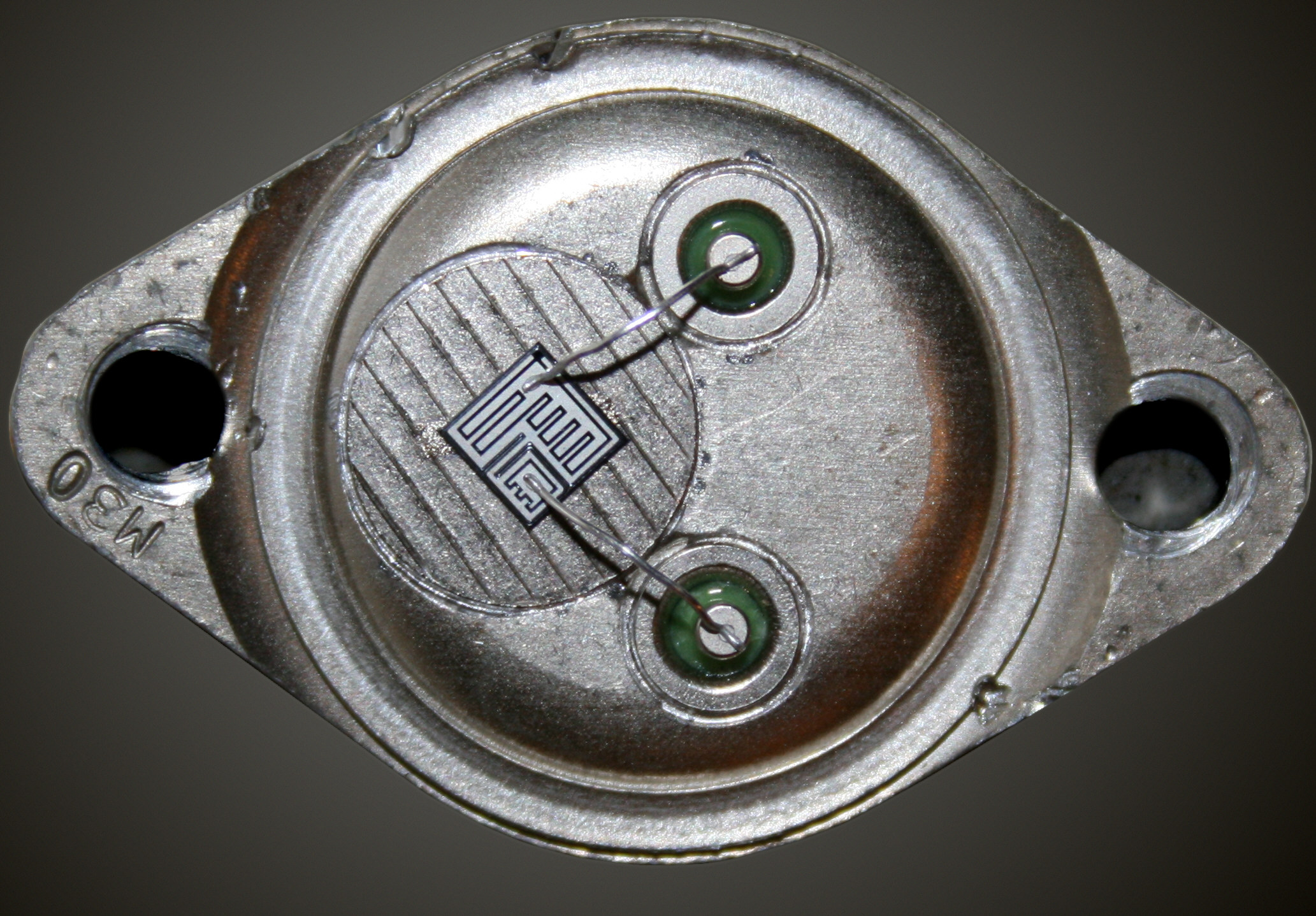
View of the chip in an MJ1000

A Darlington pair behaves like a single transistor, meaning it has one base, collector, and emitter. It typically creates a high current gain (approximately the product of the gains of the two transistors, because their β values multiply together). A general relation between the compound current gain and the individual gains is given by:

$$\beta_\mathrm{Darlington} = \beta_1 \cdot \beta_2 + \beta_1 + \beta_2$$

If β_{1} and β_{2} are high enough (hundreds), this relation can be approximated with:

$$\beta_\mathrm{Darlington} \approx \beta_1 \cdot \beta_2$$

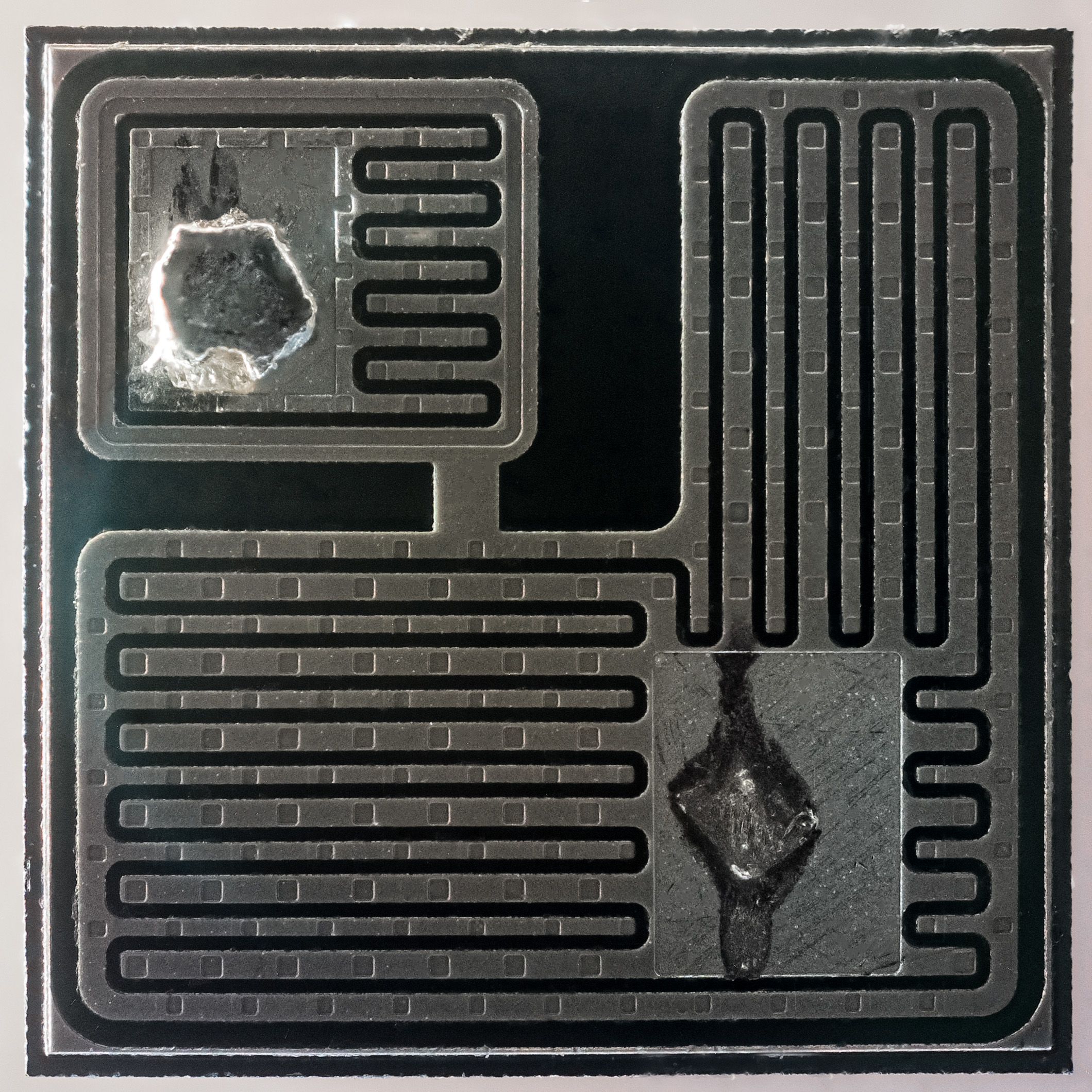
TIP122 silicon die

A typical Darlington transistor has a current gain of 1000 or more, so that only a small base current is needed to make the pair switch on much higher switched currents. Another advantage involves providing a very high input impedance for the circuit which also translates into an equal decrease in output impedance. The ease of creating this circuit also provides an advantage. It can be simply made with two separate NPN (or PNP) transistors, and is also available in a variety of single packages.

One drawback is an approximate doubling of the base–emitter voltage. Since there are two junctions between the base and emitter of the Darlington transistor, the equivalent base–emitter voltage is the sum of both base–emitter voltages:

$$V_{BE} = V_{BE1} + V_{BE2} \approx 2V_{BE1}\!$$

For silicon-based technology, where each V_{BEi} is about 0.65 V when the device is operating in the active or saturated region, the necessary base–emitter voltage of the pair is 1.3 V.

Another drawback of the Darlington pair is its increased "saturation" voltage. The output transistor is not allowed to saturate (i.e. its base–collector junction must remain reverse-biased) because the first transistor, when saturated, establishes full (100%) parallel negative feedback between the collector and the base of the second transistor. Since collector–emitter voltage is equal to the sum of its own base–emitter voltage and the collector-emitter voltage of the first transistor, both positive quantities in normal operation, it always exceeds the base-emitter voltage. (In symbols, $\mathrm{V_{CE2} = V_{CE1} + V_{BE2} > V_{BE2}} \Rightarrow \mathrm{V_{C2} > V_{B2}}$ always.) Thus the "saturation" voltage of a Darlington transistor is one V_{BE} (about 0.65 V in silicon) higher than a single transistor saturation voltage, which is typically 0.1 - 0.2 V in silicon. For equal collector currents, this drawback translates to an increase in the dissipated power for the Darlington transistor over a single transistor. The increased low output level can cause troubles when TTL logic circuits are driven.

Another problem is a reduction in switching speed or response, because the first transistor cannot actively inhibit the base current of the second one, making the device slow to switch off. To alleviate this, the second transistor often has a resistor of a few hundred ohms connected between its base and emitter terminals. This resistor provides a low-impedance discharge path for the charge accumulated on the base-emitter junction, allowing a faster transistor turn-off.

The Darlington pair has more phase shift at high frequencies than a single transistor and hence can more easily become unstable with negative feedback (i.e., systems that use this configuration can have poor performance due to the extra transistor delay).

== Packaging ==
Darlington pairs are available as integrated packages or can be made from two discrete transistors; Q_{1}, the left-hand transistor in the diagram, can be a low power type, but normally Q_{2} (on the right) will need to be high power. The maximum collector current I_{C}(max) of the pair is that of Q_{2}. A typical integrated power device is the 2N6282, which includes a switch-off resistor and has a current gain of 2400 at I_{C}=10 A.

Integrated devices can take less space than two individual transistors because they can use a shared collector. Integrated Darlington pairs come packaged singly in transistor-like packages or as an array of devices (usually eight) in an integrated circuit.

== Darlington triplet ==
A third transistor can be added to a Darlington pair to give even higher current gain, making a Darlington triplet. The emitter of the second transistor in the pair is connected to the base of the third, as the emitter of first transistor is connected to the base of the second, and the collectors of all three transistors are connected together. This gives current gain approximately equal to the product of the gains of the three transistors. However the increased current gain often does not justify the sensitivity and saturation current problems, so this circuit is seldom used.

== Applications ==
Darlington pairs are often used in the push–pull output stages of the power audio amplifiers that drive most sound systems. In a fully symmetrical push-pull circuit two Darlington pairs are connected as emitter followers driving the output from the positive and negative supply: an NPN Darlington pair connected to the positive rail providing current for positive excursions of the output, and a PNP Darlington pair connected to the negative rail providing current for negative excursions.

Before good quality PNP power transistors were available, the quasi-symmetrical push-pull circuit was used, in which only the two transistors connected to the positive supply rail were an NPN Darlington pair, and the pair from the negative rail formed a Sziklai pair.

A Darlington pair can be sensitive enough to respond to the current passed by skin contact even at safe zone voltages. Thus it can form a new input stage of a touch-sensitive switch.

Darlington transistors can be used in high-current circuits such as the LM1084 voltage regulator. Other high-current applications could include those involving computer control of motors or relays, where the current is amplified from a safe low level of the computer output line to the amount needed by the connected device.

== See also ==
- Insulated-gate bipolar transistor
- ULN2003A
- Sziklai pair, sometimes called the "complementary Darlington", a similar configuration but with transistors of opposite type (one NPN and one PNP)
- Integrated injection logic (I2L)
