= Bio-MEMS =

Microtechnology

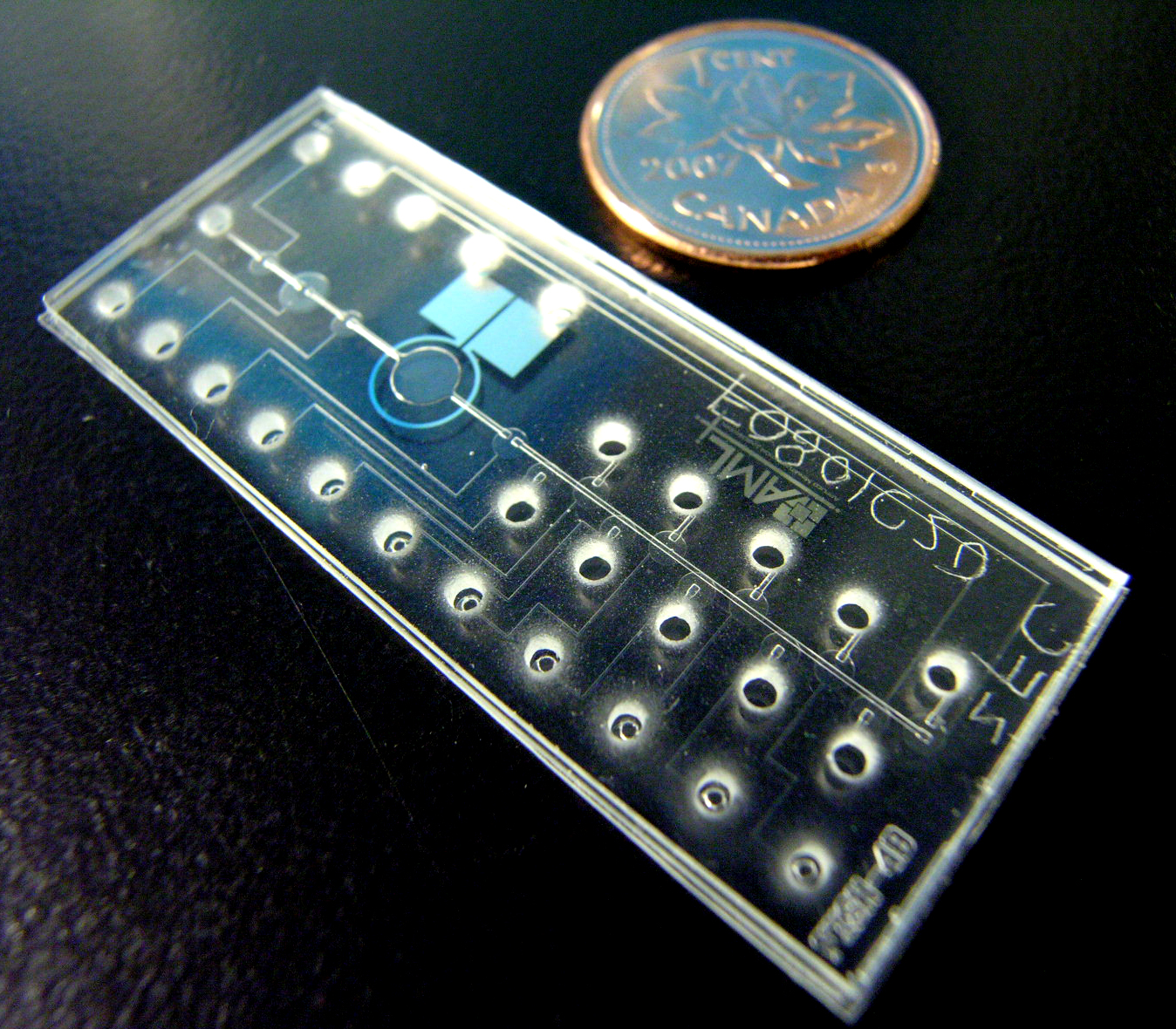
An example of a bio-MEMS device is this automated FISH microchip, which integrates a reagent multiplexer, a cell chamber with a thin-film heater layer, and a peristaltic pump.

Bio-MEMS is an abbreviation for biomedical (or biological) microelectromechanical systems. Bio-MEMS have considerable overlap, and is sometimes considered synonymous, with lab-on-a-chip (LOC) and micro total analysis systems (μTAS). Bio-MEMS is typically more focused on mechanical parts and microfabrication technologies made suitable for biological applications. On the other hand, lab-on-a-chip is concerned with miniaturization and integration of laboratory processes and experiments into single (often microfluidic) chips. In this definition, lab-on-a-chip devices do not strictly have biological applications, although most do or are amenable to be adapted for biological purposes. Similarly, micro total analysis systems may not have biological applications in mind, and are usually dedicated to chemical analysis. A broad definition for bio-MEMS can be used to refer to the science and technology of operating at the microscale for biological and biomedical applications, which may or may not include any electronic or mechanical functions. The interdisciplinary nature of bio-MEMS combines material sciences, clinical sciences, medicine, surgery, electrical engineering, mechanical engineering, optical engineering, chemical engineering, and biomedical engineering. Some of its major applications include genomics, proteomics, molecular diagnostics, point-of-care diagnostics, tissue engineering, single cell analysis and implantable microdevices.

A Venn diagram outlining and contrasting some aspects of the fields of bio-MEMS, lab-on-a-chip, μTAS.

== History ==
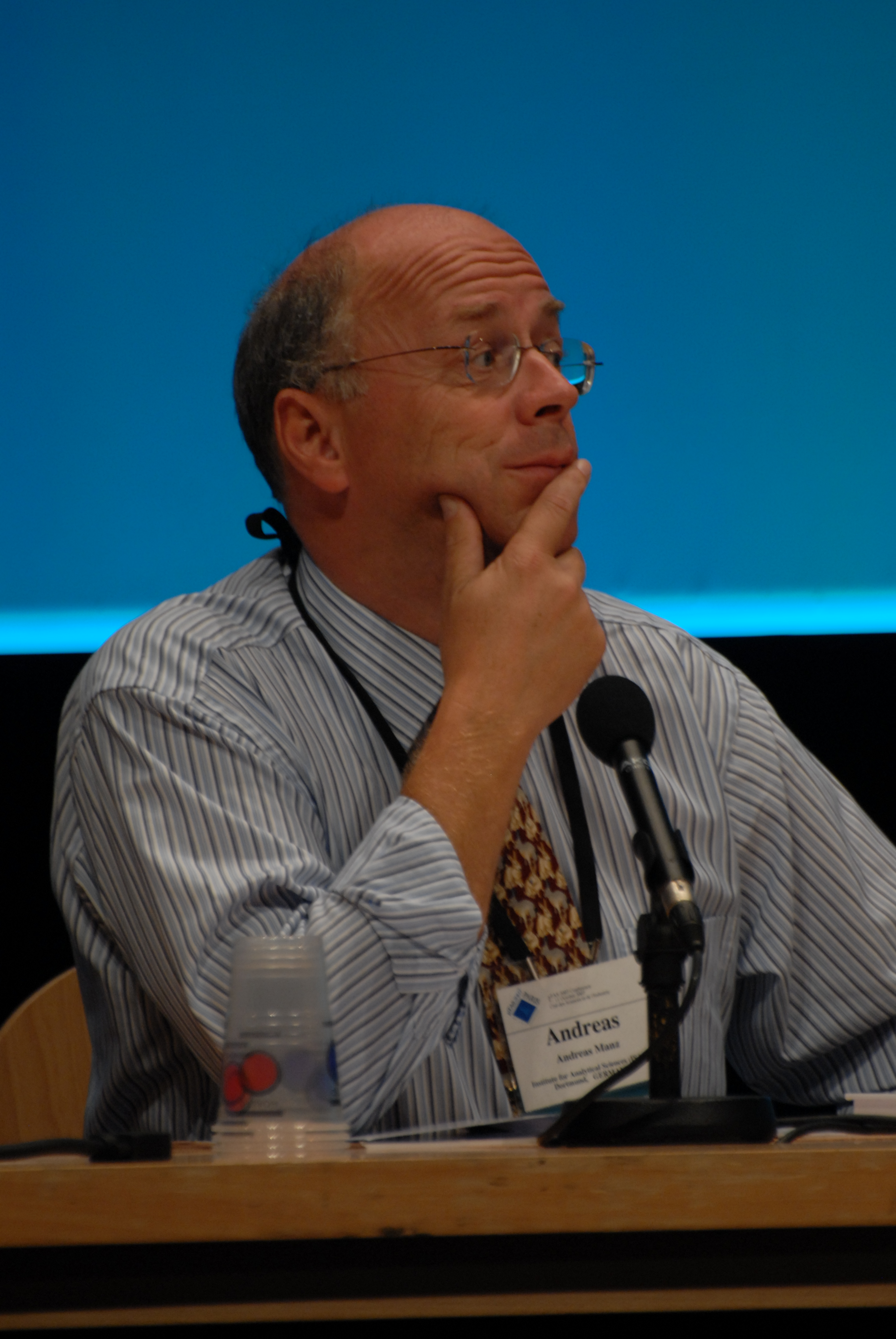
Andreas Manz, one of the pioneers of μTAS at MicroTAS conference 2007.

In 1967, S. B. Carter reported the use of shadow-evaporated palladium islands for cell attachment. After this first bio-MEMS study, subsequent development in the field was slow for around 20 years. In 1985, Unipath Inc. commercialized ClearBlue, a pregnancy test still used today that can be considered the first microfluidic device containing paper and the first microfluidic product to market. In 1990, Andreas Manz and H. Michael Widmer from Ciba-Geigy (now Novartis), Switzerland first coined the term micro total analysis system (μTAS) in their seminal paper proposing the use of miniaturized total chemical analysis systems for chemical sensing. There have been three major motivating factors behind the concept of μTAS. Firstly, drug discovery in the last decades leading up to the 1990s had been limited due to the time and cost of running many chromatographic analyses in parallel on macroscopic equipment. Secondly, the Human Genome Project (HGP), which started in October 1990, created demand for improvements in DNA sequencing capacity. Capillary electrophoresis thus became a focus for chemical and DNA separation. Thirdly, DARPA of the US Department of Defense supported a series of microfluidic research programs in the 1990s after realizing there was a need to develop field-deployable microsystems for the detection of chemical and biological agents that were potential military and terrorist threats. Researchers started to use photolithography equipment for microfabrication of microelectromechanical systems (MEMS) as inherited from the microelectronics industry. At the time, the application of MEMS to biology was limited because this technology was optimized for silicon or glass wafers and used solvent-based photoresists that were not compatible with biological material. In 1993, George M. Whitesides, a Harvard chemist, introduced inexpensive PDMS-based microfabrication and this revolutionized the bio-MEMS field. Since then, the field of bio-MEMS has exploded. Selected major technical achievements during bio-MEMS development of the 1990s include:

- In 1991, the first oligonucleotide chip was developed
- In 1998, the first solid microneedles were developed for drug delivery
- In 1994, the first continuous-flow polymerase chain reaction chip was developed and chip thermocycling was applied in continuous flow and segmented flow PCR
- In 1999, the first demonstration of heterogeneous laminar flows for selective treatment of cells in microchannels

Today, hydrogels such as agarose, biocompatible photoresists, and self-assembly are key areas of research in improving bio-MEMS as replacements or complements to PDMS.

== Approaches ==
=== Materials ===
==== Silicon and glass ====
Conventional micromachining techniques such as wet etching, dry etching, deep reactive ion etching, sputtering, anodic bonding, and fusion bonding have been used in bio-MEMS to make flow channels, flow sensors, chemical detectors, separation capillaries, mixers, filters, micropumps and valves. However, there are some drawbacks to using silicon-based devices in biomedical applications such as their high cost and bioincompatibility. Due to being single-use only, larger than their MEMS counterparts, and the requirement of clean room facilities, high material and processing costs make silicon-based bio-MEMS less economically attractive. In vivo, silicon-based bio-MEMS can be readily functionalized to minimize protein adsorption, but the brittleness of silicon remains a major issue.

==== Plastics and polymers ====
Using plastics and polymers in bio-MEMS is attractive because they can be easily fabricated, compatible with micromachining and rapid prototyping methods, as well as have low cost. Many polymers are also optically transparent and can be integrated into systems that use optical detection techniques such as fluorescence, UV/Vis absorbance, or Raman method. Moreover, many polymers are biologically compatible, chemically inert to solvents, and electrically insulating for applications where strong electrical fields are necessary such as electrophoretic separation. Surface chemistry of polymers can also be modified for specific applications. Specifically, the surface of PDMSs can be ion-irradiated with elements such as magnesium, tantalum, and iron to decrease surface hydrophobicity, allowing for better cell adhesion in in vivo applications. The most common polymers used in bio-MEMS include PMMA, PDMS, OSTEmer and SU-8.

==== Biological materials ====
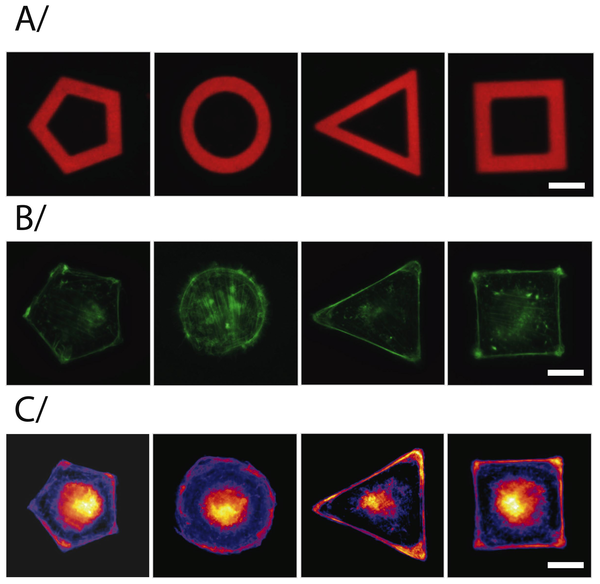
A) Micropatterning of fibronectin on PNIPAM glass surface. B) & C) Single fibroblasts are spatially constrained to the geometry of the fibronectin micropattern.

Microscale manipulation and patterning of biological materials such as proteins, cells and tissues have been used in the development of cell-based arrays, microarrays, microfabrication based tissue engineering, and artificial organs. Biological micropatterning can be used for high-throughput single cell analysis, precise control of cellular microenvironment, as well as controlled integration of cells into appropriate multi-cellular architectures to recapitulate in vivo conditions. Photolithography, microcontact printing, selective microfluidic delivery, and self-assembled monolayers are some methods used to pattern biological molecules onto surfaces. Cell micropatterning can be done using microcontact patterning of extracellular matrix proteins, cellular electrophoresis, optical tweezer arrays, dielectrophoresis, and electrochemically active surfaces.

==== Paper ====
Paper microfluidics (sometimes called lab on paper) is the use of paper substrates in microfabrication to manipulate fluid flow for different applications. Paper microfluidics have been applied in paper electrophoresis and immunoassays, the most notable being the commercialized pregnancy test, ClearBlue. Advantages of using paper for microfluidics and electrophoresis in bio-MEMS include its low cost, biodegradability, and natural wicking action. A severe disadvantage of paper-based microfluidics is the dependency of the rate of wicking on environmental conditions such as temperature and relative humidity. Paper-based analytical devices are particularly attractive for point-of-care diagnostics in developing countries for both the low material cost and emphasis on colorimetric assays which allow medical professionals to easily interpret the results by eye. Compared to traditional microfluidic channels, paper microchannels are accessible for sample introduction (especially forensic-style samples such as body fluids and soil), as well as its natural filtering properties that exclude cell debris, dirt, and other impurities in samples. Paper-based replicas have demonstrated the same effectiveness in performing common microfluidic operations such as hydrodynamic focusing, size-based molecular extraction, micro-mixing, and dilution; the common 96- and 384-well microplates for automated liquid handling and analysis have been reproduced through photolithography on paper to achieve a slimmer profile and lower material cost while maintaining compatibility with conventional microplate readers. Techniques for micropatterning paper include photolithography, laser cutting, ink jet printing, plasma treatment, and wax patterning.

=== Electrokinetics ===
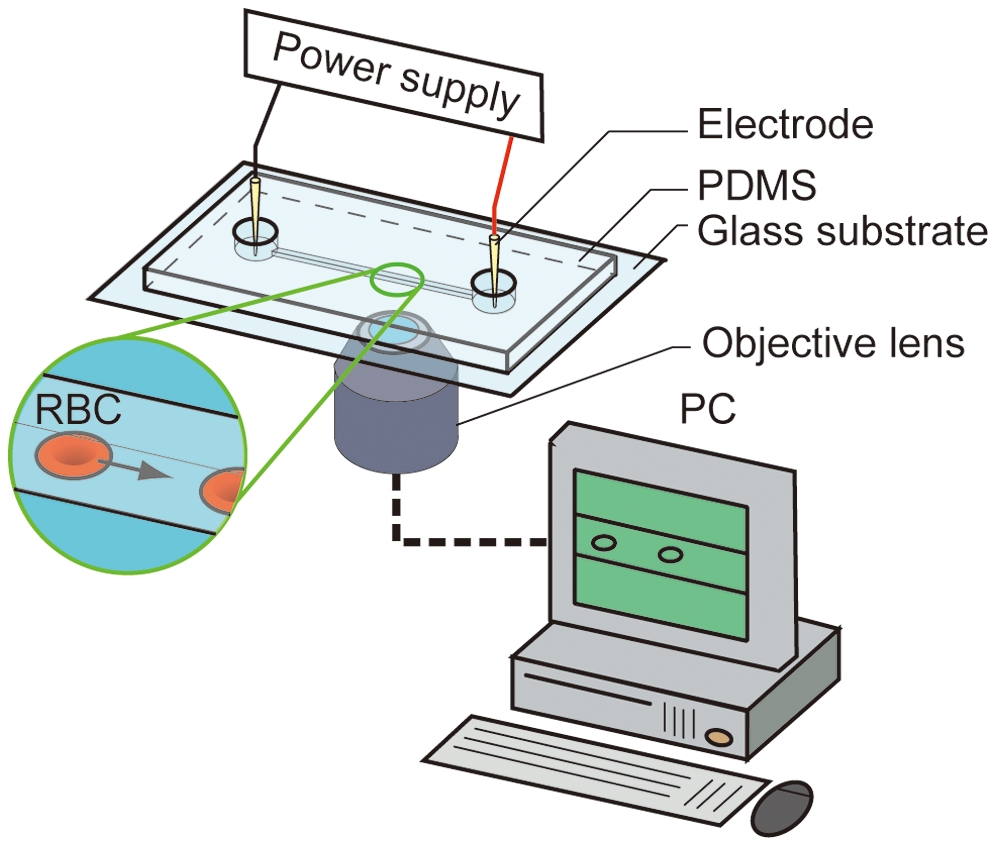
An electrophoresis experiment example: Two conical electrodes are set at both the inlet and outlet of a microchannel and cells are moved along the microchannel by an applied DC electric field.

Electrokinetics have been exploited in bio-MEMS for separating mixtures of molecules and cells using electrical fields. In electrophoresis, a charged species in a liquid moves under the influence of an applied electric field. Electrophoresis has been used to fractionate small ions, charged organic molecules, proteins, and DNA. Electrophoresis and microfluidics are highly synergistic because it is possible to use higher voltages in microchannels due to faster heat removal. Isoelectric focusing is the separation of proteins, organelles, and cells with different isoelectric points. Isoelectric focusing requires a pH gradient (usually generated with electrodes) perpendicular to the flow direction. Sorting and focusing of the species of interest is achieved because an electrophoretic force causes perpendicular migration until it flows along its respective isoelectric points. Dielectrophoresis is the motion of uncharged particles due to induced polarization from nonuniform electric fields. Dielectrophoresis can be used in bio-MEMS for dielectrophoresis traps, concentrating specific particles at specific points on surfaces, and diverting particles from one flow stream to another for dynamic concentration.

=== Microfluidics ===
Microfluidics refers to systems that manipulate small (μL, nL, pL, fL) amounts of fluids on microfabricated substrates. Microfluidic approaches to bio-MEMS confer several advantages:

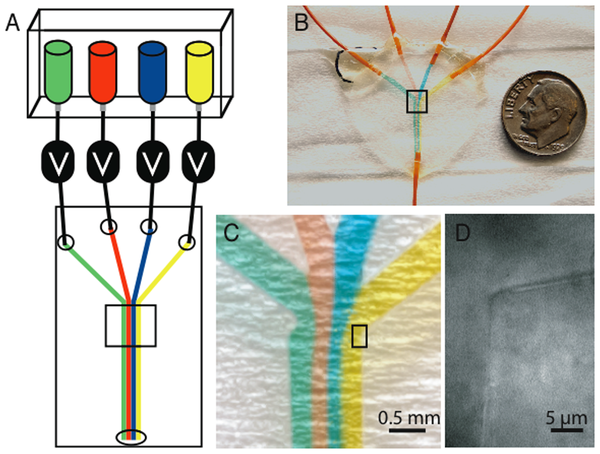
When multiple solutions are added into the same microchannel, they flow in separate flow lanes (no mixing) due to laminar flow characteristics.

- Flow in microchannels is laminar, which allows selective treatment of cells in microchannels, mathematical modelling of flow patterns and concentrations, as well as quantitative predictions of the biological environment of cells and biochemical reactions
- Microfluidic features can be fabricated on the cellular scale or smaller, which enables investigation of (sub)cellular phenomena, seeding and sorting of single cells, and recapitulation of physiological parameters
- Integration of microelectronics, micromechanics, and microoptics onto the same platform allows automated device control, which reduces human error and operation costs
- Microfluidic technology is relatively economical due to batch fabrication and high-throughput (parallelization and redundancy). This allows the production of disposable or single-use chips for improved ease of use and reduced probability of biological cross contamination, as well as rapid prototyping
- Microfluidic devices consume much smaller amounts of reagents, can be made to require only a small amount of analytes for chemical detection, require less time for processes and reactions to complete, and produces less waste than conventional macrofluidic devices and experiments
- Appropriate packaging of microfluidic devices can make them suitable for wearable applications, implants, and portable applications in developing countries

An interesting approach combining electrokinetic phenomena and microfluidics is digital microfluidics. In digital microfluidics, a substrate surface is micropatterned with electrodes and selectively activated. Manipulation of small fluid droplets occurs via electrowetting, which is the phenomenon where an electric field changes the wettability of an electrolyte droplet on a surface.

==== Flow control ====
Lithographic methods for microfluidic device manufacturing are ineffective in forming the screw-type mechanisms used in macroscale valves. Therefore, microfluidic devices require alternative flow control techniques, a number of which are currently popular:

===== Quake Valves =====
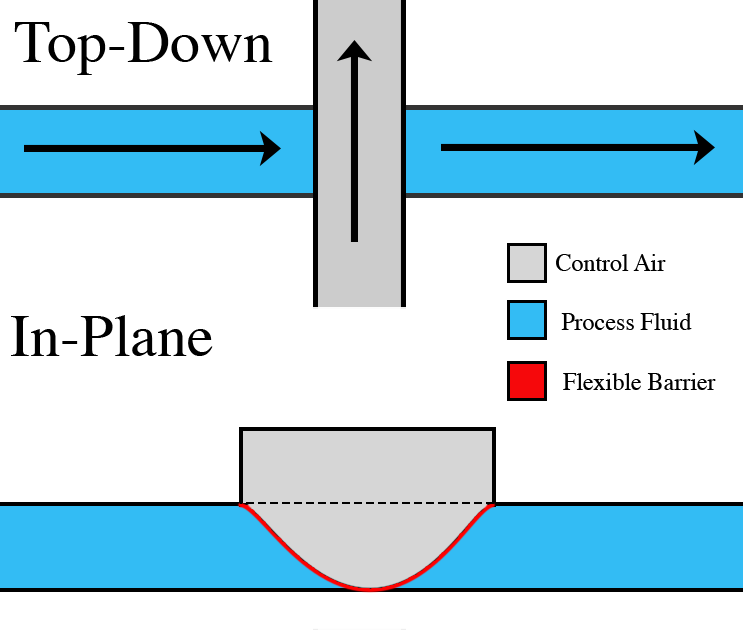
Schematic of a quake valve, with process fluid channel perpendicular and out of plane with the control fluid channel.

One inexpensive method of producing valves with fast actuation times and variable flow restriction is multilayer soft lithography (MSL). Valves produced through this fabrication technique are called Quake valves, because they were first created in the lab of Stephen Quake at Stanford University. The basic scheme involves two perpendicular flow conduits separated by an impermeable elastomeric membrane at their intersection. Controlled air flow passes through one conduit while the process fluid passes through the other. A pressure gradient between the two conduits, which is tuned by changing the control air flow rate, causes the membrane to deform and obstruct flow in the process channel. In MSL, the channels for both the process fluid and the control fluid are cast out of an elastomeric mold, making it an entirely additive manufacturing process.

===== Ice Valves =====
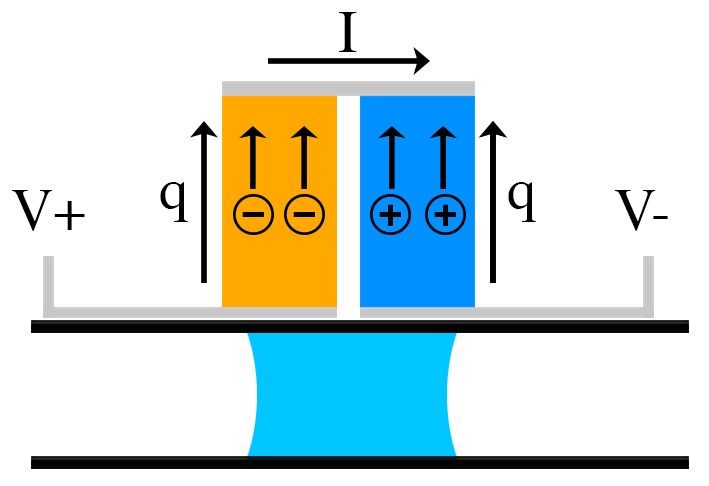
Diagram of an ice valve with Peltier cooling element.

Ice valves operate by transporting heat away from a single portion of a flow channel, causing the fluid to solidify and stop flow through that region. Thermoelectric (TE) units are used to transport heat away from the plug. Because of the limited temperature difference that TE units can provide, multiple are often chained in series to produce subzero temperatures at the substrate-fluid interface, allowing for more rapid cooling. Current state of the art ice valve technology features short closing times (0.37 s at 10 μL/min) and also operates at high flow rates (1150 μL/min). Ice valves were first introduced in 1995 where pressurized liquid carbon dioxide was used as the cooling agent.

===== Prefabricated Valves =====
Prefabricated mechanical screw valves and solenoid valves require no advanced microfabrication processes and are easy to implement in soft substrate materials like PDMS. Screw valves, unlike Quake and ice valves, maintain their level of flow restriction without power input, and are thus ideal for situations where the valve position may remain mostly constant and actuation by a human operator is acceptable. Electromagnetic solenoid valves have similar actuation times compared to Quake valves, but have larger footprints and are not integrated into the device substrate. This is an issue when device dimensions are an issue, such as in implantable devices.

==== Micro-scale Mixing ====
Despite the fact that diffusion times are significantly shorter in microfluidic systems due to small length scales, there are still challenges to removing concentration gradients at the time scales required for microfluidic technologies.

===== Sonication Mixing Elements =====
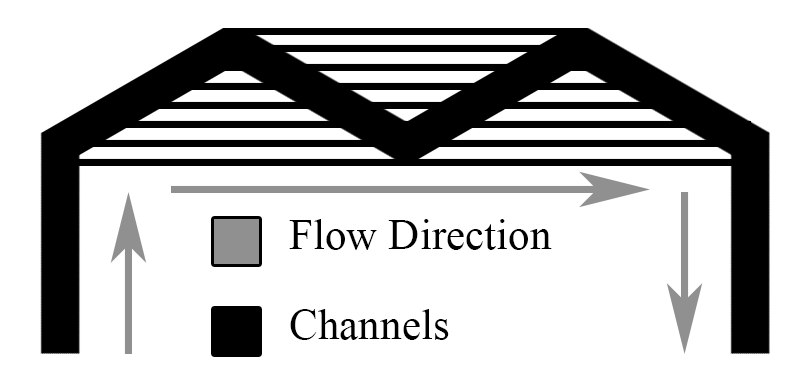
A passive flow mixing element. Laminar flow with axial concentration gradients flows in, and laminar flow with diminished concentration gradients flows out.

Sonication is often employed to provide local mixing of streams through the generation of ultra-high energy acoustics. Microfluidic chips utilizing sonication mixing can have both integrated and externally located ultrasonic transducers. Sonication is also used widely for cell lysis and homogenization in both macro and microfluidic systems. The primary mechanism of cell lysis by sonication is intense local heating and shear forces.

===== Passive Mixing Elements =====
In a passive mixing element, mixing is achieved by temporal and spatial redistribution of incoming laminar flow through the use of parallel conduits of variable path length and or diameter. The net result of having a variety of parallel flow channels of varying length is that material initially at the edge of the laminar flow profile can be repeatedly redistributed to the opposite edge, thus drastically shortening the characteristic diffusion length scale.

== As miniaturized biosensors ==
Biosensors are devices that consist of a biological recognition system, called the bioreceptor, and a transducer. The interaction of the analyte with the bioreceptor causes an effect that the transducer can convert into a measurement, such as an electrical signal. The most common bioreceptors used in biosensing are based on antibody–antigen interactions, nucleic acid interactions, enzymatic interactions, cellular interactions, and interactions using biomimetic materials. Common transducer techniques include mechanical detection, electrical detection, and optical detection.

=== Micromechanical sensors ===
Mechanical detection in bio-MEMS is achieved through micro- and nano-scale cantilevers for stress sensing and mass sensing, or micro- and nano-scale plates or membranes. In stress sensing, the biochemical reaction is performed selectively on one side of the cantilever to cause a change in surface free energy. This results in bending of the cantilever that is measurable either optically (laser reflection into a four-position detector) or electrically (piezo-resistor at the fixed edge of the cantilever) due to a change in surface stress. In mass sensing, the cantilever vibrates at its resonant frequency as measured electrically or optically. When a biochemical reaction takes place and is captured on the cantilever, the mass of the cantilever changes, as does the resonant frequency. Analysis of this data can be slightly less straightforward, however, as adsorption of sample to the cantilever has also been found to change the Young's modulus of the cantilever. Changing cantilever stiffness will also change its resonant frequency, and thus the noise in the oscillation signal must be analyzed to determine whether the resonant frequency is also a function of changing elasticity. One common use for this technique is in detecting nucleotide mismatches in DNA because the variation in mass caused by the presence of an incorrect base is enough to change the resonant frequency of the cantilever and register a signal. Mass sensing is not as effective in fluids because the minimum detectable mass is much higher in damped mediums. Suspended microchannel resistors are a special type of cantilever design that are able to work around this limitation using microfluidic channels inside the cantilever. These channels can move in situ samples around on the cantilever, without submerging the cantilever, minimally impacting its oscillation. This technology is in its infancy, however, and it is still not able to be used beyond a few, limited applications. The advantage of using cantilever sensors is that there is no need for an optically detectable label on the analyte or bioreceptors.

=== Electrical and electrochemical sensors ===
Electrical and electrochemical detection are easily adapted for portability and miniaturization, especially in comparison to optical detection. In amperometric biosensors, an enzyme-catalyzed redox reaction causes a redox electron current that is measured by a working electrode. Amperometric biosensors have been used in bio-MEMS for detection of glucose, galactose, lactose, urea, and cholesterol, as well as for applications in gas detection and DNA hybridization. In potentiometric biosensors, measurements of electric potential at one electrode are made in reference to another electrode. Examples of potentiometric biosensors include ion-sensitive field effect transistors (ISFET), Chemical field-effect transistors (chem-FET), and light-addressable potentiometric sensors (LAPS). In conductometric biosensors, changes in electrical impedance between two electrodes are measured as a result of a biomolecular reaction. Conductive measurements are simple and easy to use because there is no need for a specific reference electrode, and have been used to detect biochemicals, toxins, nucleic acids, and bacterial cells.

=== Optical sensors ===
A challenge in optical detection is the need for integrating detectors and photodiodes in a miniaturized portable format on the bio-MEMS. Optical detection includes fluorescence-based techniques, chemiluminescence-based techniques, and surface plasmon resonance (SPR). Fluorescence-based optical techniques use markers that emit light at specific wavelengths and the presence or enhancement/reduction (e.g. fluorescence resonance energy transfer) in optical signal indicates a reaction has occurred. Fluorescence-based detection has been used in microarrays and PCR on a chip devices. Chemiluminescence is light generation by energy release from a chemical reaction. Bioluminescence and electrochemiluminescence are subtypes of chemiluminescence. Surface plasmon resonance sensors can be thin-film refractometers or gratings that measure the resonance behaviour of surface plasmon on metal or dielectric surfaces. The resonance changes when biomolecules are captured or adsorbed on the sensor surface and depends on the concentration of the analyte as well as its properties. Surface plasmon resonance has been used in food quality and safety analysis, medical diagnostics, and environmental monitoring.

== For diagnostics ==
=== Genomic and proteomic microarrays ===
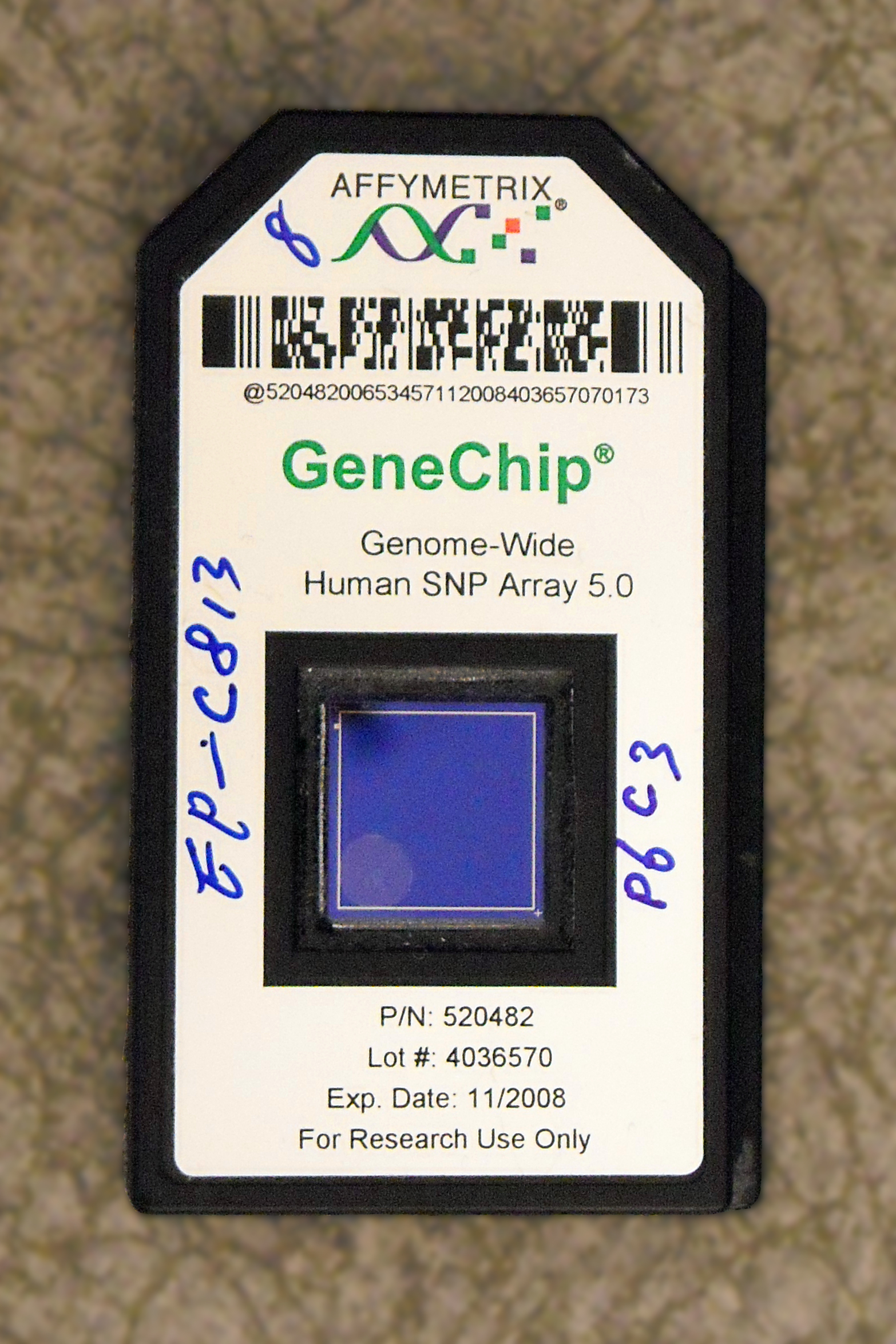
Affymetrix GeneChip is an example of a genomic microarray.

The goals of genomic and proteomic microarrays are to make high-throughput genome analysis faster and cheaper, as well as identify activated genes and their sequences. There are many different types of biological entities used in microarrays, but in general the microarray consists of an ordered collection of microspots each containing a single defined molecular species that interacts with the analyte for simultaneous testing of thousands of parameters in a single experiment. Some applications of genomic and proteomic microarrays are neonatal screening, identifying disease risk, and predicting therapy efficacy for personalized medicine.

==== Oligonucleotide chips ====
Oligonucleotide chips are microarrays of oligonucleotides. They can be used for detection of mutations and expression monitoring, and gene discovery and mapping. The main methods for creating an oligonucleotide microarray are by gel pads (Motorola), microelectrodes (Nanogen), photolithography (Affymetrix), and inkjet technology (Agilent).

- Using gel pads, prefabricated oligonucleotides are attached to patches of activated polyacrylamide
- Using microelectrodes, negatively charged DNA and molecular probes can be concentrated on energized electrodes for interaction
- Using photolithography, a light exposure pattern is created on the substrate using a photomask or virtual photomask projected from a digital micromirror device. The light removes photolabile protecting groups from the selected exposure areas. Following de-protection, nucleotides with a photolabile protecting group are exposed to the entire surface and the chemical coupling process only occurs where light was exposed in the previous step. This process can be repeated to synthesize oligonucleotides of relatively short lengths on the surface, nucleotide by nucleotide.
- Using inkjet technology, nucleotides are printed onto a surface drop by drop to form oligonucleotides

==== cDNA microarray ====
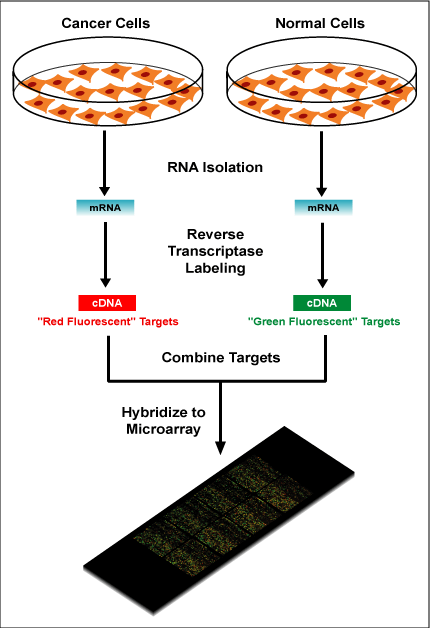
Differential comparison in cDNA microarray

cDNA microarrays are often used for large-scale screening and expression studies. In cDNA microarrays, mRNA from cells are collected and converted into cDNA by reverse transcription. Subsequently, cDNA molecules (each corresponding to one gene) are immobilized as ~100 μm diameter spots on a membrane, glass, or silicon chip by metallic pins. For detection, fluorescently-labelled single strand cDNA from cells hybridize to the molecules on the microarray and a differential comparison between a treated sample (labelled red, for example) and an untreated sample (labelled in another color such as green) is used for analysis. Red dots mean that the corresponding gene was expressed at a higher level in the treated sample. Conversely, green dots mean that the corresponding gene was expressed at a higher level in the untreated sample. Yellow dots, as a result of the overlap between red and green dots, mean that the corresponding gene was expressed at relatively the same level in both samples, whereas dark spots indicate no or negligible expression in either sample.

==== Peptide and protein microarrays ====
The motivation for using peptide and protein microarrays is firstly because mRNA transcripts often correlate poorly with the actual amount of protein synthesized. Secondly, DNA microarrays cannot identify post-translational modification of proteins, which directly influences protein function. Thirdly, some bodily fluids such as urine lack mRNA. A protein microarray consists of a protein library immobilized on a substrate chip, usually glass, silicon, polystyrene, PVDF, or nitrocellulose. In general, there are three types of protein microarrays: functional, analytical or capture, and reverse-phase protein arrays.

- Functional protein arrays display folded and active proteins and are used for screening molecular interactions, studying protein pathways, identifying targets for post-translational modification, and analyzing enzymatic activities.
- Analytical or capture protein arrays display antigens and antibodies to profile protein or antibody expression in serum. These arrays can be used for biomarker discovery, monitoring of protein quantities, monitoring activity states in signalling pathways, and profiling antibody repertories in diseases.
- Reverse-phase protein arrays test replicates of cell lysates and serum samples with different antibodies to study the changes in expression of specific proteins and protein modifications during disease progression, as well as biomarker discovery.

Protein microarrays have stringent production, storage, and experimental conditions due to the low stability and necessity of considering the native folding on the immobilized proteins. Peptides, on the other hand, are more chemically resistant and can retain partial aspects of protein function. As such, peptide microarrays have been used to complement protein microarrays in proteomics research and diagnostics. Protein microarrays usually use Escherichia coli to produce proteins of interest; whereas peptide microarrays use the SPOT technique (stepwise synthesis of peptides on cellulose) or photolithography to make peptides.

=== PCR chips ===
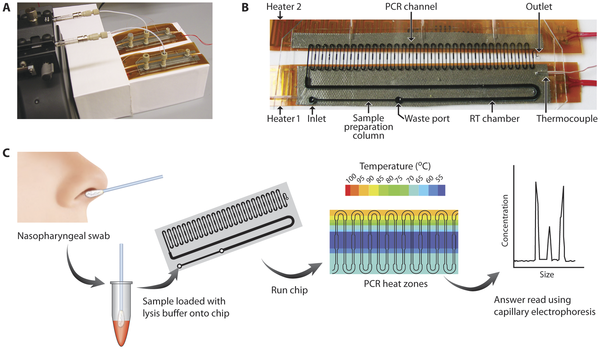
Continuous flow-based PCR microfluidic system with thin film heaters, syringe pump, and continuous flow PCR channel. The application of this example bio-MEMS is for amplification of influenza A RNA in respiratory specimens

The polymerase chain reaction (PCR) is a fundamental molecular biology technique that enables the selective amplification of DNA sequences, which is useful for expanded use of rare samples e.g.: stem cells, biopsies, circulating tumor cells. The reaction involves thermal cycling of the DNA sequence and DNA polymerase through three different temperatures. Heating up and cooling down in conventional PCR devices are time-consuming and typical PCR reactions can take hours to complete. Other drawbacks of conventional PCR is the high consumption of expensive reagents, preference for amplifying short fragments, and the production of short chimeric molecules. PCR chips serve to miniaturize the reaction environment to achieve rapid heat transfer and fast mixing due to the larger surface-to-volume ratio and short diffusion distances. The advantages of PCR chips include shorter thermal-cycling time, more uniform temperature which enhances yield, and portability for point-of-care applications. Two challenges in microfluidic PCR chips are PCR inhibition and contamination due to the large surface-to-volume ratio increasing surface-reagent interactions. For example, silicon substrates have good thermal conductivity for rapid heating and cooling, but can poison the polymerase reaction. Silicon substrates are also opaque, prohibiting optical detection for qPCR, and electrically conductive, preventing electrophoretic transport through the channels. Meanwhile, glass is an ideal material for electrophoresis but also inhibits the reaction. Polymers, particularly PDMS, are optically transparent, not inhibitory, and can be used to coat an electrophoretic glass channel. Various other surface treatments also exist, including polyethylene glycol, bovine serum albumin, and silicon dioxide. There are stationary (chamber-based), dynamic (continuous flow-based), and microdroplet (digital PCR) chip architectures.

- Chamber-based architecture is the result of shrinking down of conventional PCR reactors, which is difficult to scale up. A four-layer glass-PDMS device has been developed using this architecture integrating microvalves, microheaters, temperature sensors, 380-nL reaction chambers, and capillary electrophoresis channels for reverse transcription polymerase chain reaction (RT-PCR) that has attomolar detection sensitivity.
- Continuous flow-based architecture moves the sample through different temperature zones to achieve thermal cycling. This approach uses less energy and has high throughput, but has large reagent consumption and gas bubbles can form inside the flow channels.
- Digital PCR eliminates sample/reagent surface adsorption and contamination by carrying out PCR in microdroplets or microchambers. PCR in droplets also prevents recombination of homologous gene fragments so synthesis of short chimeric products is eliminated.

=== Point-of-care-diagnostic devices ===
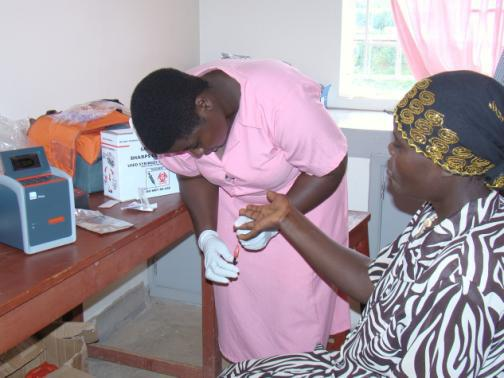
A midwife draws blood to measure patients' CD4 count within 20 minutes using the Pima point-of-care CD4 analyzer, in Uganda.

The ability to perform medical diagnosis at the bedside or at the point-of-care is important in health care, especially in developing countries where access to centralized hospitals is limited and prohibitively expensive. To this end, point-of-care diagnostic bio-MEMS have been developed to take saliva, blood, or urine samples and in an integrated approach perform sample preconditioning, sample fractionation, signal amplification, analyte detection, data analysis, and result display. In particular, blood is a very common biological sample because it cycles through the body every few minutes and its contents can indicate many aspects of health.

==== Sample conditioning ====
In blood analysis, white blood cells, platelets, bacteria, and plasma must be separated. Sieves, weirs, inertial confinement, and flow diversion devices are some approaches used in preparing blood plasma for cell-free analysis. Sieves can be microfabricated with high-aspect-ratio columns or posts, but are only suitable for low loading to avoid clogging with cells. Weirs are shallow mesa-like sections used to restrict flow to narrow slots between layers without posts. One advantage of using weirs is that the absence of posts allows more effective recycling of retentate for flow across the filter to wash off clogged cells. Magnetic beads are used to aid in analyte separation. These microscopic beads are functionalized with target molecules and moved through microfluidic channels using a varying magnetic field. This serves as a quick method of harvesting targets for analysis. After this process is complete, a strong, stationary magnetic field is applied to immobilize the target-bound beads and wash away unbound beads. The H-filter is a microfluidic device with two inlets and two outlets that takes advantage of laminar flow and diffusion to separate components that diffuse across the interface between two inlet streams. By controlling the flow rate, diffusion distance, and residence time of the fluid in the filter, cells are excluded from the filtrate by virtue of their slower diffusion rate. The H-filter does not clog and can run indefinitely, but analytes are diluted by a factor of two. For cell analysis, cells can be studied intact or after lysis. A lytic buffer stream can be introduced alongside a stream containing cells and by diffusion induces lysis prior to further analysis. Cell analysis is typically done by flow cytometry and can be implemented into microfluidics with lower fluid velocities and lower throughput than their conventional macroscopic counterparts.

==== Sample fractionation ====
Microfluidic sample separation can be achieved by capillary electrophoresis or continuous-flow separation. In capillary electrophoresis, a long thin tube separates analytes by voltage as they migrate by electro-osmotic flow. For continuous-flow separation, the general idea is to apply a field at an angle to the flow direction to deflect the sample flow path toward different channels. Examples of continuous-flow separation techniques include continuous-flow electrophoresis, isoelectric focusing, continuous-flow magnetic separations, and molecular sieving.

==== Outstanding Challenges ====
- Most diagnostic devices on the market can only test for one disease. Moreover, most devices are binary output (yes/no) without nuanced information on the patient's condition. Thus, in addition to developing tests for more diseases, scientists are currently working to expand the complexity of these devices, in order to increase their utility.
- It is difficult to manufacture MEMS diagnostic devices outside of the laboratory setting. Much of the research on these devices takes place in climate controlled laboratories, where the devices can be tested shortly after they are produced. However, as many of these devices are used to screen for tropical diseases, they must be robust enough to survive in hot, humid conditions. They must also be stored for long periods from the time of production to the time of use.
- Funding is scarce for tropical disease research. In addition, there are many regulatory hurdles that must be cleared before a medical device is approved, which can cost tens of millions of dollars. Thus, companies focusing on tropical diseases must often combine their research objectives for tropical disease with research on other, more well-funded areas of medical research.

=== Circulating Tumor Cell (CTC) Capture Technologies ===
The work of Z. Hugh Fan and his team at the University of Florida involves the use of ligand-binding nucleic acid sequences known as aptamers, which are attached to the channels of microfluidic devices to isolate various types of CTCs based on their specificities (Fan et al., 2013). Other notable advancements include the creation of nano-Velcro surfaces by Hsian-Rong Tseng's team at UCLA, designed to enhance cell capture efficiency through nanostructured polymer fiber meshes (Tseng et al., 2012), and the development of sinusoidal channels by Steven A. Soper's group at UNC Chapel Hill, which improves cell capture via geometrical modifications (Soper et al., 2011). These innovations collectively enhance the sensitivity and specificity of CTC detection, providing valuable tools for cancer prognosis and treatment.

== In tissue engineering ==
=== Cell culture ===
Conventional cell culture technology is unable to efficiently allow combinatorial testing of drug candidates, growth factors, neuropeptides, genes, and retroviruses in cell culture medium. Due to the need for cells to be fed periodically with fresh medium and passaged, even testing a few conditions requires a large number of cells and supplies, expensive and bulky incubators, large fluid volumes (~0.1 – 2 mL per sample), and tedious human labour. The requirement of human labour also limits the number and length between time points for experiments. Microfluidic cell cultures are potentially a vast improvement because they can be automated, as well as yield lower overall cost, higher throughput, and more quantitative descriptions of single-cell behaviour variability. By including gas exchange and temperature control systems on chip, microfluidic cell culturing can eliminate the need for incubators and tissue culture hoods. However, this type of continuous microfluidic cell culture operation presents its own unique challenges as well. Flow control is important when seeding cells into microchannels because flow needs to be stopped after the initial injection of cell suspension for cells to attach or become trapped in microwells, dielectrophoretic traps, micromagnetic traps, or hydrodynamic traps. Subsequently, flow needs to be resumed in a way that does not produce large forces that shear the cells off the substrate. Dispensing fluids by manual or robotic pipetting can be replaced with micropumps and microvalves, where fluid metering is straightforward to determine as opposed to continuous flow systems by micromixers. A fully automated microfluidic cell culture system has been developed to study osteogenic differentiation of human embryonic stem cells. A handheld microfluidic cell culture incubator capable of heating and pumping cell culture solutions has also been developed. Due to the volume reduction in microfluidic cultures, the collected concentrations are higher for better signal-to-noise ratio measurements, but collection and detection is correspondingly more difficult. In situ microscopy assays with microfluidic cell cultures may help in this regard, but have inherently lower throughput due to the microscope probe having only a small field of view. The Berkeley Lights Beacon platform has resolved the issue of collection and detection by performing microfluidic culture on an array of photoconductors which can be optoelectrically activated to manipulate cells across the chip. This platform has been adopted by Amgen and Novartis for cell line development in the biopharmaceutical industry. Micropatterned co-cultures have also contributed to bio-MEMS for tissue engineering to recapitulate in vivo conditions and 3D natural structure. Specifically, hepatocytes have been patterned to co-culture at specific cell densities with fibroblasts to maintain liver-specific functions such as albumin secretion, urea synthesis, and p450 detoxification. Similarly, integrating microfluidics with micropatterned co-cultures has enabled modelling of organs where multiple vascularized tissues interface, such as the blood–brain barrier and the lungs. Organ-level lung functions have been reconstituted on lung-on-a-chip devices where a porous membrane and the seeded epithelial cell layer are cyclically stretched by applied vacuum on adjacent microchannels to mimic inhalation.

=== Stem-cell engineering ===
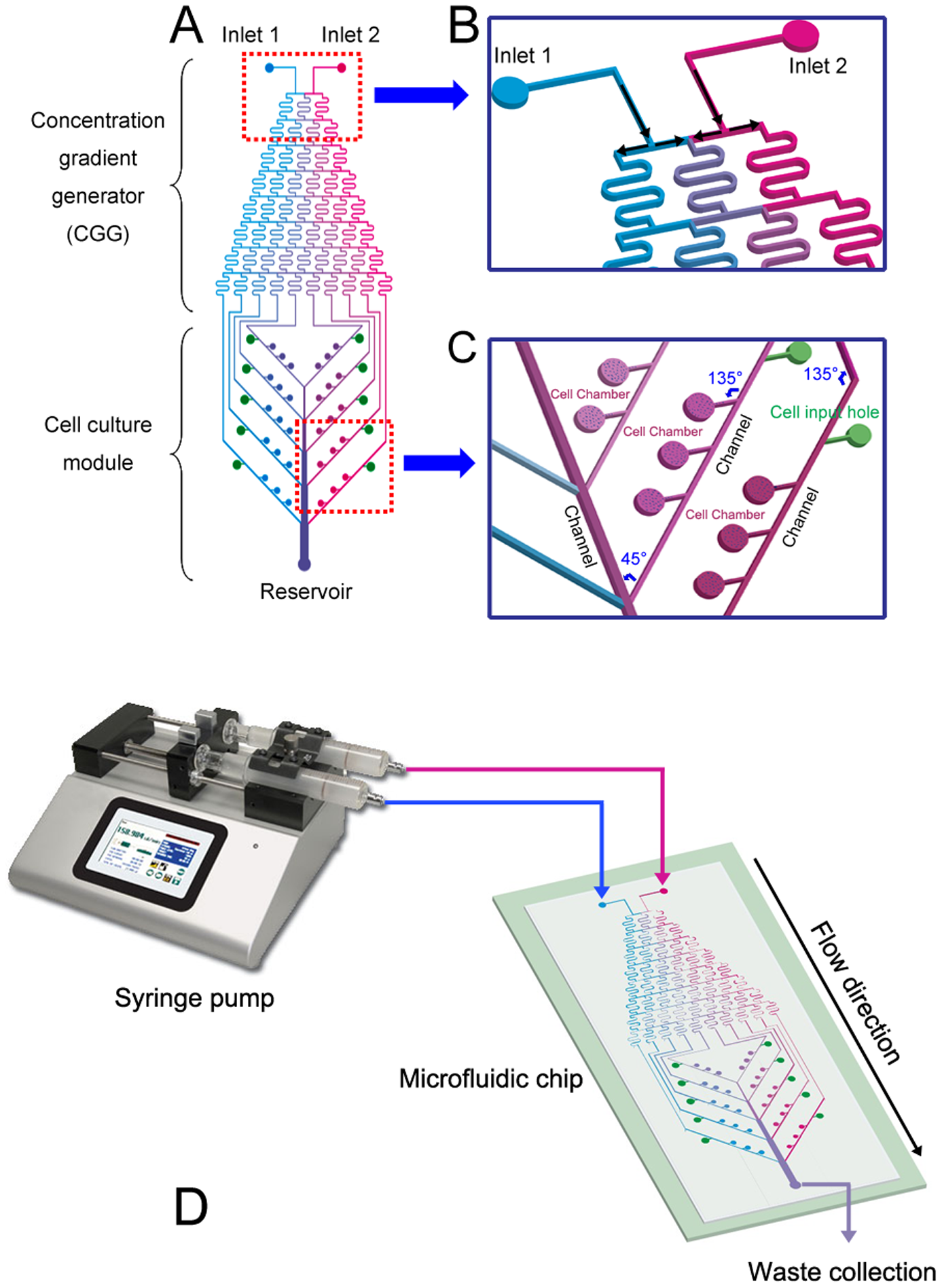
An integrated microfluidic device with a concentration gradient generator and individual cell chambers for studying dose-dependent effects of differentiation inducing factors.

The goal of stem cell engineering is to be able to control the differentiation and self-renewal of pluripotency stem cells for cell therapy. Differentiation in stem cells is dependent on many factors, including soluble and biochemical factors, fluid shear stress, cell-ECM interactions, cell-cell interactions, as well as embryoid body formation and organization. Bio-MEMS have been used to research how to optimize the culture and growth conditions of stem cells by controlling these factors. Assaying stem cells and their differentiated progeny is done with microarrays for studying how transcription factors and miRNAs determine cell fate, how epigenetic modifications between stem cells and their daughter cells affect phenotypes, as well as measuring and sorting stem cells by their protein expression.

==== Biochemical factors ====
Microfluidics can leverage its microscopic volume and laminar flow characteristics for spatiotemporal control of biochemical factors delivered to stem cells. Microfluidic gradient generators have been used to study dose-response relationships. Oxygen is an important biochemical factor to consider in differentiation via hypoxia-induced transcription factors (HIFs) and related signaling pathways, most notably in the development of blood, vasculature, placental, and bone tissues. Conventional methods of studying oxygen effects relied on setting the entire incubator at a particular oxygen concentration, which limited analysis to pair-wise comparisons between normoxic and hypoxic conditions instead of the desired concentration-dependent characterization. Developed solutions include the use of continuous axial oxygen gradients and arrays of microfluidic cell culture chambers separated by thin PDMS membranes to gas-filled microchannels.

==== Fluid shear stress ====
Fluid shear stress is relevant in the stem cell differentiation of cardiovascular lineages as well as late embryogenesis and organogenesis such as left-right asymmetry during development. Macro-scale studies do not allow quantitative analysis of shear stress to differentiation because they are performed using parallel-plate flow chambers or rotating cone apparatuses in on-off scenarios only. Poiseuille flow in microfluidics allows shear stresses to be varied systematically using channel geometry and flow rate via micropumps, as demonstrated by using arrays of perfusion chambers for mesenchymal stem cells and fibroblast cell adhesion studies.

==== Cell–ECM interactions ====
Cell-ECM interactions induce changes in differentiation and self-renewal by the stiffness of the substrate via mechanotransduction, and different integrins interacting with ECM molecules. Micropatterning of ECM proteins by micro-contact printing, inkjet printing, and mask spraying have been used in stem cell-ECM interaction studies. It has been found by using micro-contact printing to control cell attachment area that that switch in osteogenic / adipogenic lineage in human mesenchymal stem cells can be cell shape dependent. Microfabrication of microposts and measurement of their deflection can determine traction forces exerted on cells. Photolithography can also be used to cross-link cell-seeded photo-polymerizable ECM for three-dimensional studies. Using ECM microarrays to optimize combinatorial effects of collagen, laminin, and fibronectin on stem cells is more advantageous than conventional well plates due to its higher throughput and lower requirement of expensive reagents.

==== Cell–cell interactions ====
Cell fate is regulated by both interactions between stem cells and interactions between stem cells and membrane proteins. Manipulating cell seeding density is a common biological technique in controlling cell–cell interactions, but controlling local density is difficult and it is often difficult to decouple effects between soluble signals in the medium and physical cell–cell interactions. Micropatterning of cell adhesion proteins can be used in defining the spatial positions of different cells on a substrate to study human ESC proliferation. Seeding stem cells into PDMS microwells and flipping them onto a substrate or another cell layer is a method of achieving precise spatial control. Gap junction communications has also been studied using microfluidics whereby negative pressure generated by fluid flow in side channels flanking a central channel traps pairs of cells that are in direct contact or separated by a small gap. However, in general, the non-zero motility and short cell cycle time of stem cells often disrupt the spatial organization imposed by these microtechnologies.

==== Embryoid body formation and organization ====
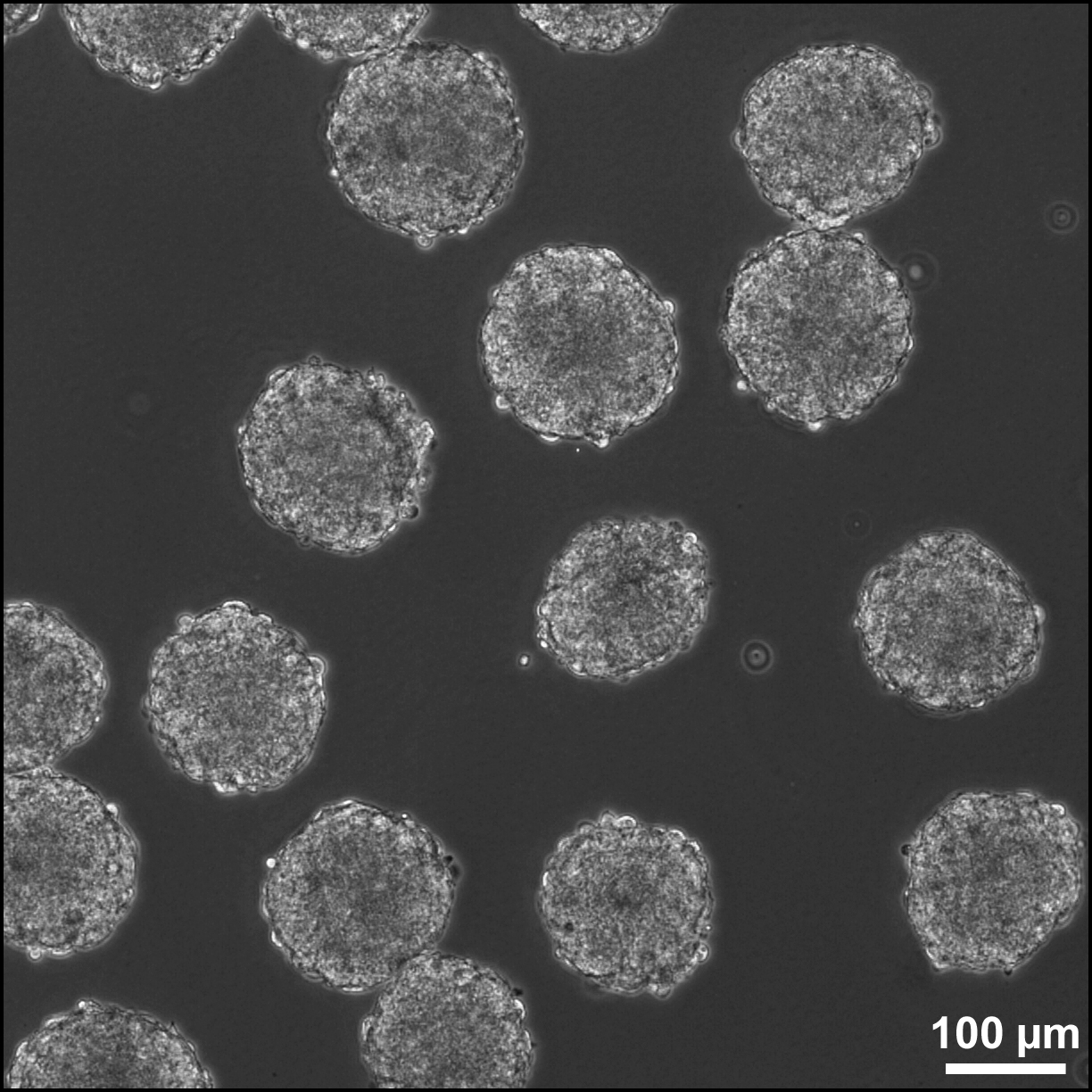
Murine embryoid bodies in suspension culture after 24 hours of formation from embryonic stem cells.

Embryoid bodies are a common in vitro pluripotency test for stem cells and their size needs to be controlled to induce directed differentiation to specific lineages. High throughput formation of uniform sized embryoid bodies with microwells and microfluidics allows easy retrieval and more importantly, scale up for clinical contexts. Actively controlling embryoid body cell organization and architecture can also direct stem cell differentiation using microfluidic gradients of endoderm-, mesoderm- and ectoderm-inducing factors, as well as self-renewal factors.

=== Assisted reproductive technologies ===
Assisted reproductive technologies help to treat infertility and genetically improve livestock. However, the efficiency of these technologies in cryopreservation and the in vitro production of mammalian embryos is low. Microfluidics have been applied in these technologies to better mimic the in vivo microenvironment with patterned topographic and biochemical surfaces for controlled spatiotemporal cell adhesion, as well as minimization of dead volumes. Micropumps and microvalves can automate tedious fluid-dispensing procedures and various sensors can be integrated for real-time quality control. Bio-MEMS devices have been developed to evaluate sperm motility, perform sperm selection, as well as prevent polyspermy in in-vitro fertilization.

== In medical implants and surgery ==
=== Implantable microelectrodes ===
The goal of implantable microelectrodes is to interface with the body's nervous system for recording and sending bioelectrical signals to study disease, improve prostheses, and monitor clinical parameters. Microfabrication has led to the development of Michigan probes and the Utah electrode array, which have increased electrodes per unit volume, while addressing problems of thick substrates causing damage during implantation and triggering foreign-body reaction and electrode encapsulation via silicon and metals in the electrodes. Michigan probes have been used in large-scale recordings and network analysis of neuronal assemblies, and the Utah electrode array has been used as a brain–computer interface for the paralyzed. Extracellular microelectrodes have been patterned onto an inflatable helix-shaped plastic in cochlear implants to improve deeper insertion and better electrode-tissue contact for transduction of high-fidelity sounds. Integrating microelectronics onto thin, flexible substrates has led to the development of a cardiac patch that adheres to the curvilinear surface of the heart by surface tension alone for measuring cardiac electrophysiology, and electronic tattoos for measuring skin temperature and bioelectricity. Wireless recording of electrophysiological signals is possible through addition of a piezocrystal to a circuit of two recording electrodes and a single transistor on an implanted micro-device. An external transducer emits pulses of ultrasonic energy} which impinge on the piezocrystal, and extracellular voltage changes are backscattered ultrasonically by the piezocrystal, allowing for measurement. A network of so-called "neural dust" motes can map signals throughout a region of the body where the micro-sensors are implanted.

=== Microtools for surgery ===
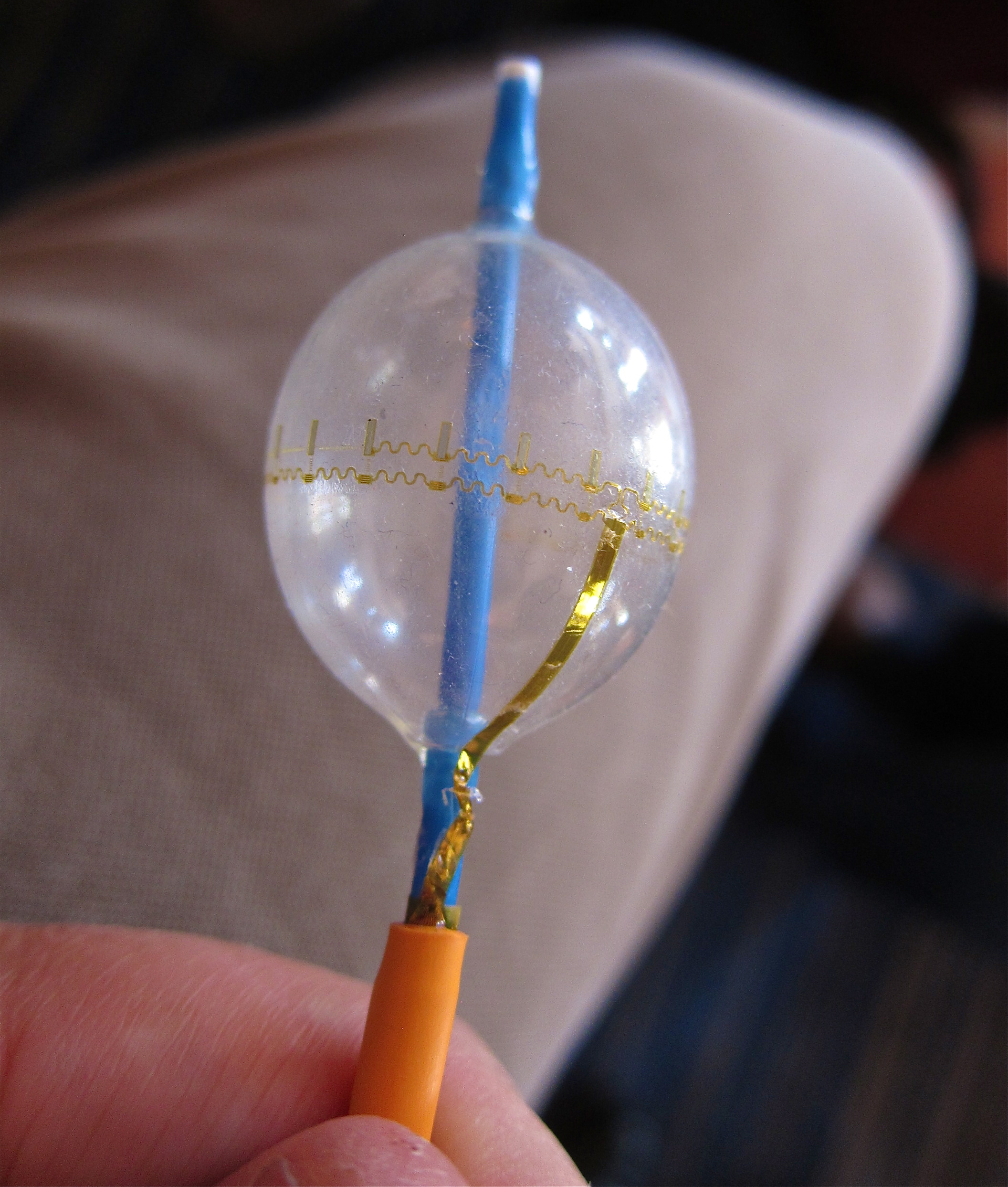
A cardiac balloon catheter with temperature sensors, electrocardiography sensors, and LEDs is a surgical bio-MEMS.

Bio-MEMS for surgical applications can improve existing functionality, add new capabilities for surgeons to develop new techniques and procedures, and improve surgical outcomes by lowering risk and providing real-time feedback during the operation. Micromachined surgical tools such as tiny forceps, microneedle arrays and tissue debriders have been made possible by metal and ceramic layer-by-layer microfabrication techniques for minimally invasive surgery and robotic surgery. Incorporation of sensors onto surgical tools also allows tactile feedback for the surgeon, identification of tissue type via strain and density during cutting operations, and diagnostic catheterization to measure blood flows, pressures, temperatures, oxygen content, and chemical concentrations.

=== Drug delivery ===
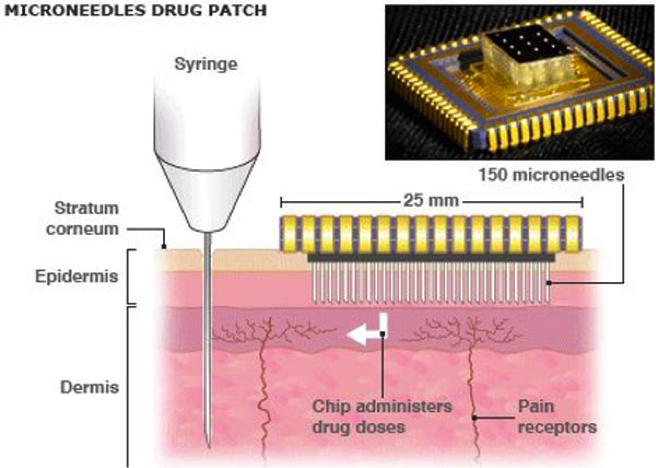
Transdermal microneedles patch is less invasive compared to conventional drug delivery by hypodermic needle.

Microneedles, formulation systems, and implantable systems are bio-MEMS applicable to drug delivery. Microneedles of approximately 100μm can penetrate the skin barrier and deliver drugs to the underlying cells and interstitial fluid with reduced tissue damage, reduced pain, and no bleeding. Microneedles can also be integrated with microfluidics for automated drug loading or multiplexing. From the user standpoint, microneedles can be incorporated into a patch format for self-administration, and do not constitute a sharp waste biohazard (if the material is polymeric). Drug delivery by microneedles include coating the surface with therapeutic agents, loading drugs into porous or hollow microneedles, or fabricating the microneedles with drug and coating matrix for maximum drug loading. Microneedles for interstitial fluid extraction, blood extraction, and gene delivery are also being developed. The efficiency of microneedle drug delivery remains a challenge because it is difficult to ascertain if the microneedles effectively penetrated the skin. Some drugs, such as diazepam, are poorly soluble and need to be aerosolized immediately prior to intranasal administration. Bio-MEMS technology using piezoelectric transducers to liquid reservoirs can be used in these circumstances to generate narrow size distribution of aerosols for better drug delivery. Implantable drug delivery systems have also been developed to administer therapeutic agents that have poor bioavailability or require localized release and exposure at a target site. Examples include a PDMS microfluidic device implanted under the conjunctiva for drug delivery to the eye to treat ocular diseases and microchips with gold-capped drug reservoirs for osteoporosis. In implantable bio-MEMS for drug delivery, it is important to consider device rupture and dose dumping, fibrous encapsulation of the device, and device explantation. Most drugs also need to be delivered in relatively large quantities (milliliters or even greater), which makes implantable bio-MEMS drug delivery challenging due to their limited drug-holding capacity.
