= Z. Hugh Fan =

US-based biomedical engineer

Distinguished Professor Z. Hugh Fan FASME, FAAAS
- Occupations: Scientist, engineer, academic
- Years active: 1980s—present
- Known for: His contribution to the field of microfluidics, particularly for pioneering papers in early 1990s and for advancing the capabilities and accessibility of biomedical diagnostics and environmental health monitoring.
- Title: Distinguished Professor
- Board member of: Scientific Reports, Microsystems & Nanoengineering, Biomedical Materials
- Awards: Career Award, US National Institutes of Health (2011); Fraunhofer-Bessel Award, Alexander von Humboldt Foundation (2010); E.T.S. Walton Award, Science Foundation Ireland (2009)

Academic background
- Education: Postdoc at Ames Laboratory, US Department of Energy, Iowa State University (1994–1995); Ph.D. in Analytical Chemistry (1993), University of Alberta; B.Sc. in Chemistry (1985), Yangzhou Teachers’ College
- Alma mater: University of Alberta

Academic work
- Era: 1989—present
- Discipline: Biomedical Engineering
- Sub-discipline: Microfluidics and BioMEMS
- Institutions: University of Florida (UF); ACLARA BioSciences, Inc. (Mountain View, CA); Sarnoff Corporation (Princeton, NJ); Iowa State University; University of Alberta
- Main interests: Microfluidics, biomedical Microelectromechanical System (BioMEMS), sensors, cancer and medical diagnostics, pathogens and virus detection
- Website: https://mae.ufl.edu/hfan/

Z. Hugh Fan FASME FAAAS is a US-based biomedical engineer, chemist, scientist, inventor, and academic. Hugh Fan is the Steve and Louise Scott Excellence Fellow and Distinguished Professor of Mechanical and Aerospace Engineering at the University of Florida (UF). At UF, he is director of the Microfluidics and BioMEMS Laboratory, a research lab and part of the Interdisciplinary Microsystems Group (IMG). Hugh Fan is a Fellow of the American Institute for Medical and Biological Engineering (AIMBE), the American Society of Mechanical Engineers (ASME), and the American Association for the Advancement of Science (AAAS). He is known for his pioneering work in microfluidics in the early 1990s, while his research work spans microfluidics, biomedical microelectromechanical systems (BioMEMS), sensors, cancer and medical diagnostics, and pathogen and virus detection. Hugh Fan's work has significantly contributed to the development of lab-on-a-chip technologies and microfluidic devices for various biomedical applications. He has developed microfluidic devices using aptamers, special DNA or RNA sequences, to isolate and study different types of circulating tumor cells (CTCs) in the blood, offering an alternative to antibody-based methods. In 2018, Hugh Fan and John Lednicky co-led a team at the University of Florida that developed a rapid, cost-effective point-of-care test for the Zika virus. Their work with C. Y. Wu on SARS-CoV-2 (severe-acute-respiratory-syndrome-related coronavirus) in 2020 helped change the opinion on virus transmission route from “droplets” in 2020 to “airborne” in 2021.

== Early life and education ==
Hugh Fan studied at Yangzhou Teachers College where he graduated with a Bachelor of Science in chemistry in 1985. From 1985 to 1989, he worked as an Assistant Teacher at Yangzhou Teachers' College. In 1989, he moved to Canada where he pursued his doctoral studies at the University of Alberta and received his Ph.D. in 1994. From 1994 to 1995, he was a post-doctoral fellow at Ames Laboratory. (Note: A United States Department of Energy national laboratory located in Ames, Iowa, and affiliated with Iowa State University.)

== Career ==
Hugh Fan worked for Sarnoff Corporation from 1995 to 2000. In 2000, he became principal scientist at Aclara Biosciences. In 2003, he joined the University of Florida (UF) as an associate professor of mechanical and aerospace engineering. He was tenured in 2008. Hugh Fan became a full professor of Mechanical and Aerospace Engineering in 2013 and held the position until July 2024, when he became a distinguished professor of mechanical and aerospace engineering at UF.

Hugh Fan has been a member of the UF Health Cancer Center (since 2005) and a member of the Emerging Pathogens Institute (since 2008). He has been an affiliate professor at the Department of Chemistry since 2012 and an affiliate professor at the J. Crayton Pruitt Family Department of Biomedical Engineering since 2004. He was a Humboldt Visiting Professor at the Fraunhofer Institute of Biomedical Engineering in 2010, and an E.T.S. Walton Fellow at the Biomedical Diagnostics Institute at Dublin City University in 2009.

In 2014, Hugh Fan was named a University of Florida Research Foundation (UFRF) Professor.

=== Research and inventions ===
Hugh Fan is known for his pioneering work in microfluidics in early 1990s which is often credited for helping establish microfluidics as a research field and for popularizing the subject in academia, industry and governmental agencies. His research work spans microfluidics, biomedical microelectromechanical systems (BioMEMS), sensors, cancer and medical diagnostics, and pathogen and virus detection. Hugh Fan's work has significantly contributed to the development of lab-on-a-chip technologies and microfluidic devices for various biomedical applications. He has been working on developing microfluidic devices, which are small, chip-like devices used for medical and scientific purposes. Instead of using antibodies to capture circulating tumor cells (CTCs), which are cancer cells found in the blood, he uses special DNA or RNA sequences called aptamers. These aptamers can bind specifically to different types of CTCs. By attaching these aptamers to the channels in his microfluidic devices, he could isolate different kinds of CTCs based on the specific aptamers used. This method offers an alternative to using antibodies for detecting and studying cancer cells.

In 2018, Hugh Fan and John Lednicky co-led a team at the University of Florida that developed a rapid, cost-effective point-of-care test for the Zika virus, which could detect the virus in blood, saliva, and urine specimens within an hour. The innovative device, utilizing isothermal nucleic acid amplification and a paper-based detection unit, aimed to provide accessible and timely diagnostics, especially beneficial for resource-limited settings.

In 2020, John Lednicky, C. Y. Wu, Hugh Fan, and their colleagues confirmed that airborne SARS-CoV-2 (severe-acute-respiratory-syndrome-related coronavirus) viruses are infectious. This became evidence in helping policymakers change their position on the transmission route of coronavirus disease 2019 (COVID-19) from “droplets” in 2020 to “airborne” in 2021. Their subsequent efforts on detecting SARS-CoV-2 and influenza virus are supported by National Institutes of Health and led by Hugh Fan.

==== Patents ====
- C. Y. Wu, X. Jiang, M. Pan, J. Lednicky, A. D. Theodore, Z. H. Fan, N. Afshar-Mohajer, “Bioaerosol detection systems and methods of use”, U.S. Patent 11,845,997, 2023.
- Z. H. Fan, X. Jiang., T. B. Tilly, J. Lednicky, C-Y. Wu, “Apparatus and Method for Performing Microorganism Detection”, U.S. patent application, 2021/0230533 A1, 2021.
- C. Y. Wu, X. Jiang, M. Pan, J. Lednicky, A. D. Theodore, Z. H. Fan, N. Afshar-Mohajer, “Bioaerosol detection systems and methods of use”, U.S. Patent 10,859,473, 2020.
- Z. H. Fan, J. Zhang, “Antibody and aptamer ensemble for cell isolation and enrichment”, U.S. Patent 10,466,243 B2, 2019.
- Z. H. Fan, K. Jackson, "Apparatuses and methods for high-throughput protein synthesis", U.S. Patent 10,214,713 B2, 2019.
- S. E. McBride; S. C. Cherukuri; R. Kumar; J. A. Ladd; Z. H. Fan; B. L. Bentz; P. J. Zanzucchi; “Apparatus for separating molecules”, US Patent 6,296,752, 2001.
- T. L. Fare; Z. H. Fan; P. J. Heaney, “Flow control in microfluidics devices by controlled bubble formation”, US Patent 5,992,820, 1999.
- S. C. Cherukuri; R. R. Demers; Z. H. Fan; A. W. Levine; S. E. McBride; P. J. Zanzucchi, “Method and system for inhibiting cross-contamination in fluids of combinatorial chemistry device”, US Patent 5,980,704, 1999.
- P. J. Zanzucchi; S. C. Cherukuri; S. E. McBride; R. R. Demers; A. W. Levine; B. J. Thaler; R. L. Quinn; P. L. Braun; W. Chiang; Z. H. Fan; S. A. Lipp; J. R. Matey, “Liquid distribution system”, US Patent 5,846,396, 1998.
- Z. H. Fan; A. W. Levine; S. C. Cherukuri; S. A. Lipp, “Field-assisted sealing”, US Patent 5,747,169, 1998.
- S. C. Cherukuri; R. R. Demers; Z. H. Fan; A. W. Levine; S. E. McBride; P. J. Zanzucchi, “Method and system for inhibiting cross-contamination in fluids of combinatorial chemistry device”, US Patent 5,603,351, 1997.

== Selected publications ==
=== Journal articles ===
- Adedokun, George; Alipanah, Morteza; Fan, Z. Hugh (2024). "Sample preparation and detection methods in point-of-care devices towards future at-home testing". Lab on a Chip. 24 (15): 3626–3650. doi:10.1039/d3lc00943b. PMC 11270053. PMID 38952234.
- Fan, Z. Hugh; Harrison, D. Jed (2023). "Celebrating the 30th anniversary of a pioneering microfluidics paper". Lab on a Chip. 23 (19): 4157–4159. doi:10.1039/d3lc90076b. PMC 10530399. PMID 37674417.
- Manzanas, Carlos; Alam, Md. Mahbubul; Loeb, Julia C.; Lednicky, John A.; Wu, Chang-Yu; Fan, Z. Hugh (2021). "A Valve-Enabled Sample Preparation Device with Isothermal Amplification for Multiplexed Virus Detection at the Point-of-Care". ACS Sensors. 6 (11): 4176–4184. doi:10.1021/acssensors.1c01718. PMC 8609915. PMID 34767357.
- Lednicky, John A.; Lauzardo, Michael; Fan, Z. Hugh; Jutla, Antarpreet; Tilly, Trevor B.; Gangwar, Mayank; Usmani, Moiz; Shankar, Sripriya Nannu; Mohamed, Karim; Eiguren-Fernandez, Arantza; Stephenson, Caroline J.; Alam, Md. Mahbubul; Elbadry, Maha A.; Loeb, Julia C.; Subramaniam, Kuttichantran; Waltzek, Thomas B.; Cherabuddi, Kartikeya; Morris, J. Glenn; Wu, Chang-Yu (2020). "Viable SARS-CoV-2 in the air of a hospital room with COVID-19 patients". International Journal of Infectious Diseases. 100: 476–482. doi:10.1016/j.ijid.2020.09.025. PMC 7493737. PMID 32949774.
- Chen, Kangfu; Dopico, Pablo; Varillas, Jose; Zhang, Jinling; George, Thomas J.; Fan, Z. Hugh (2019). "Integration of Lateral Filter Arrays with Immunoaffinity for Circulating-Tumor-Cell Isolation". Angewandte Chemie International Edition. 58 (23): 7606–7610. doi:10.1002/anie.201901412. PMC 6534423. PMID 30958635.
- Jiang, Xiao; Loeb, Julia C.; Manzanas, Carlos; Lednicky, John A.; Fan, Z. Hugh (2018). "Valve-Enabled Sample Preparation and RNA Amplification in a Coffee Mug for Zika Virus Detection". Angewandte Chemie International Edition. 57 (52): 17211–17214. Bibcode:2018ACIE...5717211J. doi:10.1002/anie.201809993. PMID 30358036.
- Sheng, Weian; Ogunwobi, Olorunseun O.; Chen, Tao; Zhang, Jinling; George, Thomas J.; Liu, Chen; Fan, Z. Hugh (2014). "Capture, release and culture of circulating tumor cells from pancreatic cancer patients using an enhanced mixing chip". Lab Chip. 14 (1): 89–98. doi:10.1039/C3LC51017D. PMC 3918168. PMID 24220648.
- Jackson, Kirsten; Kanamori, Takashi; Ueda, Takuya; Hugh Fan, Z. (2014). "Protein synthesis yield increased 72 times in the cell-free PURE system". Integrative Biology. 6 (8): 781–788. doi:10.1039/c4ib00088a. PMID 25008400.
- Sheng, Weian; Chen, Tao; Tan, Weihong; Fan, Z. Hugh (2013). "Multivalent DNA Nanospheres for Enhanced Capture of Cancer Cells in Microfluidic Devices". ACS Nano. 7 (8): 7067–7076. doi:10.1021/nn4023747. PMC 3785240. PMID 23837646.
- Liu, Wei; Cassano, Christopher L.; Xu, Xin; Fan, Z. Hugh (2013). "Laminated Paper-Based Analytical Devices (LPAD) with Origami-Enabled Chemiluminescence Immunoassay for Cotinine Detection in Mouse Serum". Analytical Chemistry. 85 (21): 10270–10276. doi:10.1021/ac402055n. PMID 24117197.
- Fredrickson, C.K.; Xia, Z.; Das, C.; Ferguson, R.; Tavares, F.T.; Fan, Z.H. (2006). "Effects of Fabrication Process Parameters on the Properties of Cyclic Olefin Copolymer Microfluidic Devices". Journal of Microelectromechanical Systems. 15 (5): 1060–1068. doi:10.1109/JMEMS.2006.880352.
- Fan, Z. Hugh; Mangru, Shakuntala; Granzow, Russ; Heaney, Paul; Ho, Wen; Dong, Qianping; Kumar, Rajan (1999). "Dynamic DNA Hybridization on a Chip Using Paramagnetic Beads". Analytical Chemistry. 71 (21): 4851–4859. doi:10.1021/ac9902190. PMID 10565276.
- Harrison, D. Jed; Fluri, Karl; Seiler, Kurt; Fan, Zhonghui; Effenhauser, Carlo S.; Manz, Andreas (1993). "Micromachining a Miniaturized Capillary Electrophoresis-Based Chemical Analysis System on a Chip". Science. 261 (5123): 895–897. Bibcode:1993Sci...261..895J. doi:10.1126/science.261.5123.895. PMID 17783736.
- Harrison, D. Jed.; Manz, Andreas.; Fan, Zhonghui.; Luedi, Hans.; Widmer, H. Michael. (1992). "Capillary electrophoresis and sample injection systems integrated on a planar glass chip". Analytical Chemistry. 64 (17): 1926–1932. doi:10.1021/ac00041a030.

=== Books ===
- Fan, Z. Hugh (Ed.) "Circulating Tumor Cells: Isolation and Analysis." John Wiley & Sons, 2016. ISBN 978-1-118-91553-0

== Awards, honors, and fellowships ==
=== Awards ===
- Career Award, National Institutes of Health (2011)
- Fraunhofer-Bessel Award, Alexander von Humboldt Foundation (2010)
- E.T.S. Walton Award, Science Foundation Ireland (2009)

=== Honors ===
- The University of Florida Research Foundation (UFRF) Professorship Award (2014)

=== Fellowships ===
- Fellow of the American Institute for Medical and Biological Engineering (AIMBE)
- Fellow of the American Society of Mechanical Engineers (ASME)
- Fellow of the American Association for the Advancement of Science (AAAS)
