= Centrifugal micro-fluidic biochip =

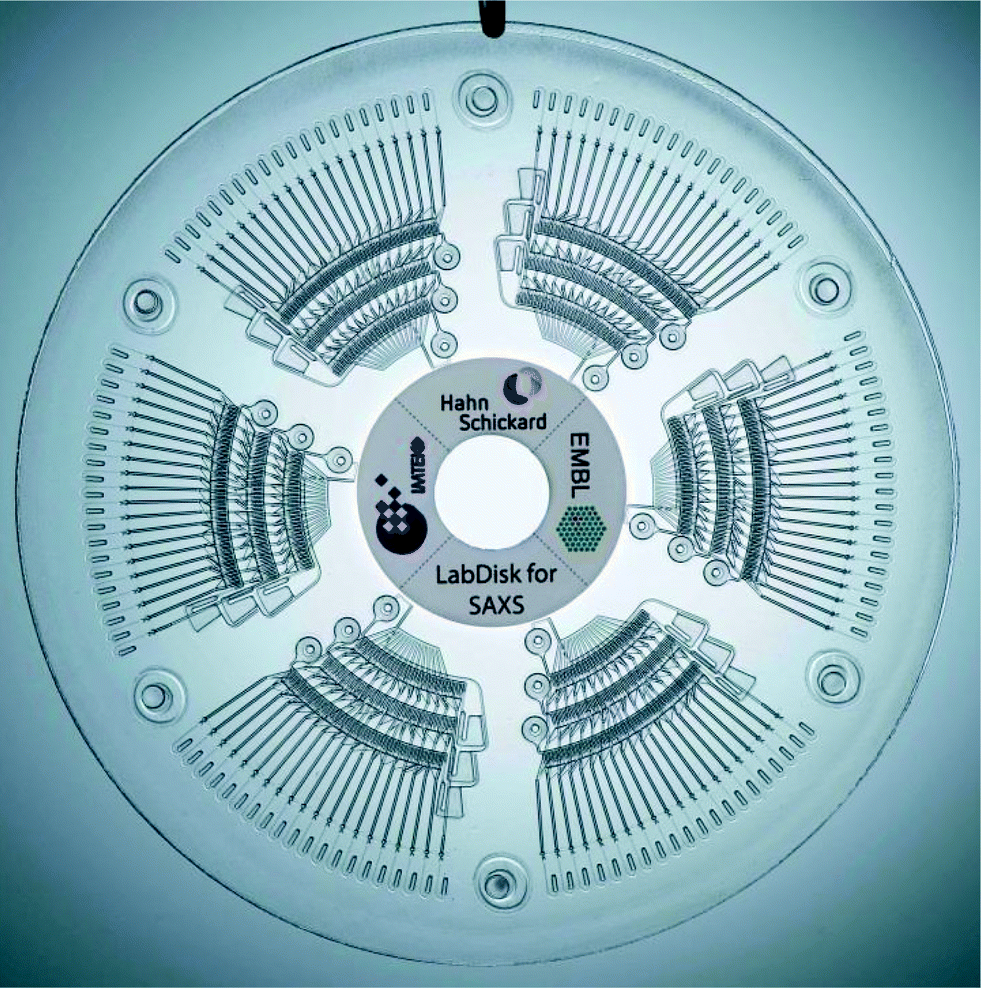
Lab disk for protein structure analysis via small-angle X-ray scattering

The centrifugal micro-fluidic biochip or centrifugal micro-fluidic biodisk is a type of lab-on-a-chip technology, also known as lab-on-a-disc, that can be used to integrate processes such as separating, mixing, reaction and detecting molecules of nano-size in a single piece of platform, including a compact disk or DVD. This type of micro-fluidic biochip is based upon the principle of microfluidics to take advantage of non-inertial pumping; for lab-on-a-chip devices using non-inertial valves and switches under centrifugal force and Coriolis effect, this is in order to distribute fluids about the disks in a highly parallel order.

This biodisk is an integration of multiple technologies in different areas. The designer must be familiar with the process of biology testing before designing the complex micro-structures in the compact disk. Some basic components such as valves, mixing units, and separating units should all be used to complete the full testing process. The basic principles applied in such micro-fluidic structures are centrifugal force, Coriolis effect, and surface tension. The micromachining techniques, including patterning, photolithography, and etching should all be used as long as the design is verified. Once the testing process is successful in the biodisk, the detection technique is started. There are many methods proposed by scientists in this area. The most popular method is immunoassay which is widely used in the testing of biology. The final step is receiving data from the biodisk by means of a CD drive and modifying either software or hardware that can achieve this function. An example method is reading data from the biodisk using a common CD drive with dedicated software, which has the advantage of being low on cost.

Once the centrifugal micro-fluidic biochip is developed well enough to be manufactured on a large scale, it is theorized to cause a wide effect on the industry as well as medical care, especially in developing countries, where high-precision equipment is not available. People in developed countries who are willing to do such regular home-care detections can also benefit from this technology.

== History ==
The centrifugal microfluidic platform, including the chip and the device, has been a focus of academic and industrial research efforts for almost 40 years. Primarily targeting biomedical applications, a range of assays have been adapted on the system. The platform has found success as a research or clinical tool and has been further commercialized recently, notably at Gamera Bioscience led by Alec Mian, Greg Kellogg, and Stephen Higgins, who implemented the concept using a compact disc format in1995. Nonetheless, this micro-fluidic lab-on-a-chip technology has experienced a rapid surge over the last 10–15 years, and new developments in centrifugal microfluidic technologies have the potential to establish widespread utilization of the platform. Therefore, different liquid-handling platforms have been developed to implement unit operations such as sample take-up, sample preconditioning, reagent supply, metering, aliquoting, valving, routing, mixing, incubation, washing, as well as analytical or preparative separations. The integration of such sample preparation, incubation, analysis on a self-contained disc in a device that controls the spinning for automatic performance encourages the sample-to-answer diagnosis in the point-of-care biomedical platform.

Dr. Marc Madou in UC Irvine is one of the leaders in the centrifugal micro-fluidic biochip. He has done several research projects on this area and has made success such as pneumatic pumping in centrifugal microfluidic platforms, integration of 3D carbon-electrode dielectrophoresis, and serial siphon valving. His group members are working on projects including cell lysis, PCR card, DNA hybridization, anthrax diagnostics and respiratory virus detection (see external links). Dr. Hua-Zhong Yu in SFU.ca also made great progress in this area, proposing a new digitized molecular diagnostic reading method and a new DNA detection method on plastic CD. (see external links) Dr. Gang Logan Liu in UIUC is currently also focusing on this area (see external links).

== Structure design ==
The design of structure bases on the principle of microfluidics and typical components are used in the platform. many structures for centrifugal microfluidic biochips have been developed, with more interesting ones yet to be released. Madou's group invented the valve-chamber structure in 2004. In recent years, Saki Kondo released the vertical liquid transportation structure, which pushed the design to become a three-dimensional concept. Madou's group also invented a serial siphon valving structure which makes flow control much easier. Hong Chen created a spiral microchannel which allows parallel testing with more steps.

=== Principle ===
The principle for the centrifugal micro-fluidic biochip includes the basic forces of a particle as well as the principle of flow control.

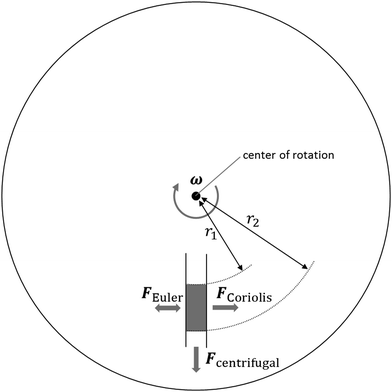
Pseudo-forces acting in centrifugal microfluidics. While the centrifugal force always acts radially outward, the Coriolis force acts perpendicular to both ω and the fluid velocity, and the Euler force is proportional to the angular acceleration.

For a particle in the flow the basic forces are centrifugal force, Coriolis force, Euler force and viscous force.

The centrifugal force plays a role as a pump in the fluid flowing. It offers the basic source to transfer the fluid flowing from the inner radius of CD to the outer radius. The magnitude of the centrifugal force is determined by the radius of particle location and the rotational speed. The formula for centrifugal force density is:

$f_\mathrm{{\omega}}=N{\omega}^2r.$

where N is the mass density of the liquid, ω the angular frequency and r the (radial) distance between the particle and center of the disk.

The formula for Coriolis force density is:

$f_\mathrm{C}=2N{\omega}u.$

where u is the flow velocity.

The Coriolis force generates when the liquid has a velocity component along the radial direction. This force is generally smaller than the centrifugal force when the rotating speed is not high enough. When it comes to a high angular frequency, the Coriolis force makes a difference to the flow of liquid, which is often used to separate fluid flow in the separation unit.

Another basic force is Euler force, which is often defined as the acceleration of angular frequency. For example, when the CD is rotating at a constant speed, the Euler force is relatively slow. The formula for Euler force density is:

$f_\mathrm{E}=Nr\frac{d{\omega}}{dt}.$

As for a particle in the fluidic flow, the viscous force is:

$f_\mathrm{v}=v\frac{\partial^2 u}{\partial x^2}.$

v is the viscosity of the liquid.

As for the entire fluid flow, surface tension plays an important role in flow control. When the flow comes across a varied cross section, the surface tension will balance the centrifugal force and as a result block the flow of liquid. Higher rotation speed is necessary if the liquid would like to enter the next chamber. In this way, due to surface tension, the flowing process is divided into several steps which makes it simpler to realize flow control.

=== Typical component ===
There are various typical units in a centrifugal microfluidic structure, including valves, volume metering, mixing and flow switching. These types of units can make up structures that can be used in a variety of ways.

==== Valves ====
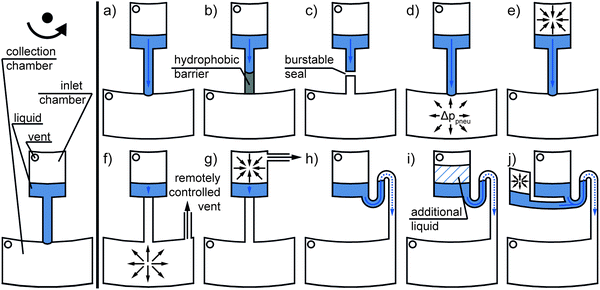
Passive valves solely actuated by centrifugal forces: (a) capillary, (b) hydrophobic, (c) burstable seal, (d) centrifugo-pneumatic overpressure, (e) centrifugo-pneumatic under pressure, (f) remotely vented collection chamber (e.g., by wetting a dissolvable film), (g) remotely vented inlet chamber (e.g., by a clepsydra structure), (h) capillary siphon, (i) overflow siphon, and (j) pneumatic siphon valve.

The principle of valves is the balance between centrifugal force and surface tension. When the centrifugal force is smaller than the surface tension, the liquid flow will be held in the original chamber; when the centrifugal force overbalances the surface tension due to a higher rotating speed, the liquid flow will break the valve and flow into the next chamber. This can be used to control the flow process simply by controlling the rotating speed of the disk.

The most commonly used valves include the hydrophilic valve, the hydrophobic valve, the syphon valve and sacrificial valve.

As for hydrophilic and hydrophobic valves, the generation of surface tension is almost the same. It is the sudden change of cross section of the channel that generates the surface tension. The liquid flow will be held in a hydrophilic channel when the cross section suddenly becomes large, while the flow will be held when the cross section of hydrophobic channel suddenly shrinks.

The siphon valve is based on the siphon phenomenon. When the cross-section of the channel is small enough, the liquid in the chamber can flow along the channel due to surface tension. Unlike hydrophilic or hydrophobic valves, surface tension acts as a pump in this model while centrifugal force acts as resistance.

The sacrificial valve is a technique that is controlled by laser irradiation. These sacrificial valves are composed of iron oxide nanoparticles dispersed in paraffin wax. Upon excitation with a laser diode, iron oxide nanoparticles within the wax act as integrated nanoscale heating elements, causing the wax to quickly melt at relatively low intensities of laser diode excitation. The valve operation is independent of the spin speed or the location of the valves and therefore allows for more complex biological assays integrated on the disk.

==== Volume metering ====
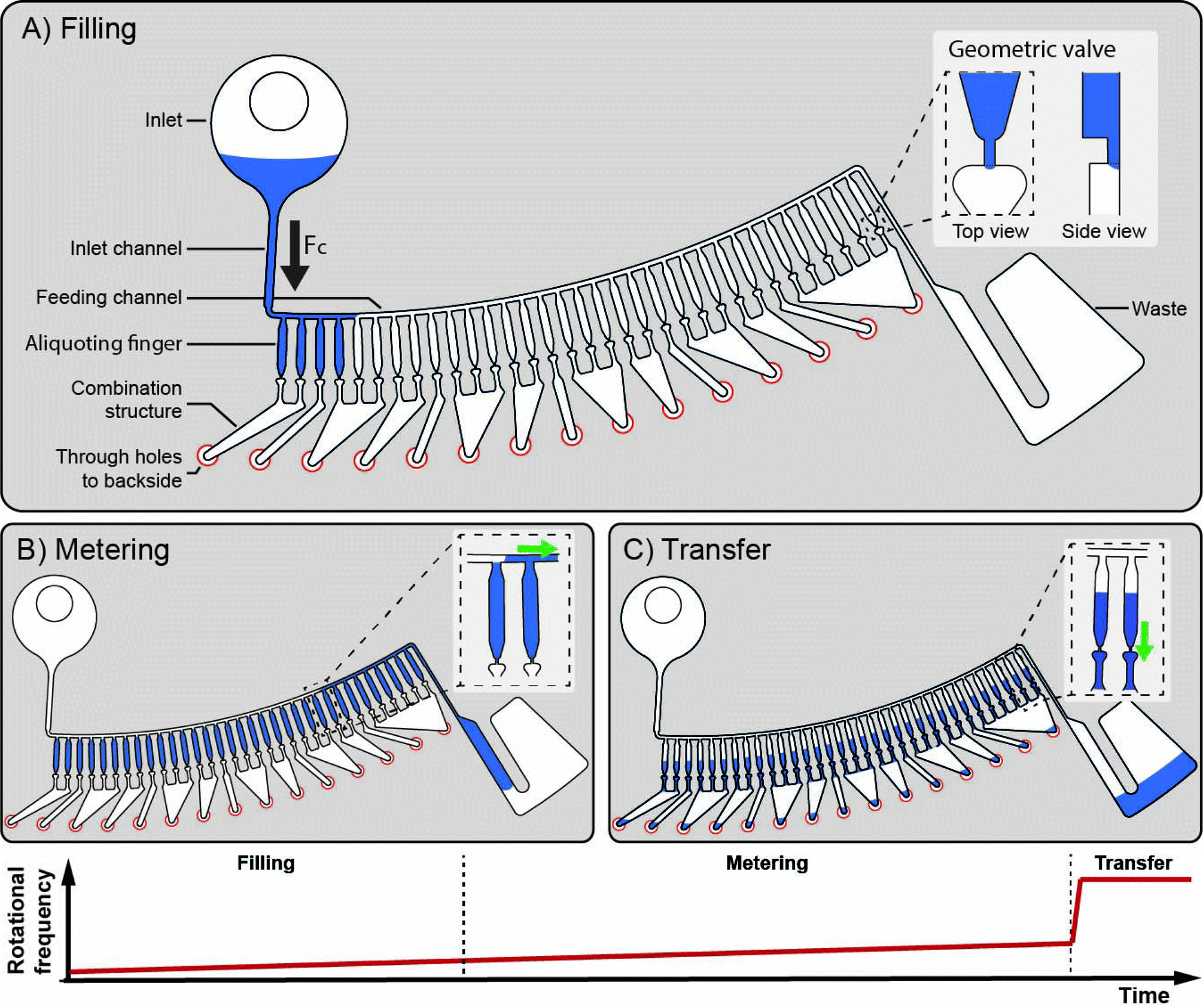
Aliquoting principle.

Volume metering is a typical function of centrifugal fluidics to reach a certain amount of liquid reagent. It can be achieved by simply connecting an overflow channel to the chamber. Once the liquid is at the level of the overflow channel, the rest of the liquid will be routed into the waste chamber connected to the overflow channel.

==== Mixing ====
Mixing is an important function in microfluidics, which combines various reagents for downstream analysis. As the fluid is confined in the micro-scale domain, mixing becomes difficult due to the low Reynolds number with laminar flow. That indicates that there is no convective mixing but diffusion, which limits the mixing process. This problem can be solved using several methods. A typical way is to rotate the disk in different directions, namely clockwise and anticlockwise rotation.

==== Flow switching ====
Flow switching is necessary when routing reagents into different chambers. A common method for flow switching in a centrifugal device is to utilize the Coriolis force within a Y-shaped structure. When the rotating speed is too low, the liquid flow will follow the original path; when the rotating speed is high enough, which is at almost the same level as centrifugal force, the liquid flow will be routed into another chamber.

==== Others ====
Other functions such as sedimentation are also used in microfluidic platforms when necessary. Due to the different mass and radius between different particles, these particles can be separated by viscosity and velocity. In this way, the sedimentation of different particles can be achieved.

== Materials ==
Many structures can be formed using the most common, rapid prototyping technology, soft lithography with polydimethylsiloxane(PDMS). PDMS is an inexpensive, clear elastomeric polymer with rubbery mechanical properties at room temperature. In the laboratory, PDMS is mixed in small batches, poured onto moulds, for example, poly(methyl methacrylate) (PMMA), with micro-scale features, and cured at moderate temperatures for minutes to hours. Open PDMS channels are closed by adhering the channel bearing component to a glass slide or a second, flat piece of PDMS. Inlets and outlets can be formed easily using punch tools. Although many surface modifications are not permanent on PDMS due to its relatively high chain mobility compared with polymers, PDMS still remains relevant as a material for microfluidic applications.

Thermoplastics are also coming into use. The use of engineering thermoplastics has many advantages, although most of these advantages have not yet been realized. There are few commodity plastics that have emerged as suitable for medical microfluidic applications. These include PMMA, polystyrene, polycarbonate, and a variety of cyclic polyolefin materials. PMMA has good optical properties for fluorescence, and UV detection modes are relatively easy to seal to themselves. These are available in grades suitable for both injection and compression molding. Polystyrene is a material known for assay development. Polycarbonates have a high glass transition temperature but poor optical properties for fluorescent detection. The cyclic polyolefins appear to have the best combination of optical and mechanical properties.

== Detection ==
=== Signal sending ===
==== Sample preparation ====
Before the molecules react with the reagents, they should be prepared for the reactions. The most typical is separation by centrifugal force. In the case of blood, for example, the sedimentation of blood cells from plasma can be achieved by rotating the biodisk for some time. After separation, all molecular diagnostic assays require a step of cell/viral lysis in order to release genomic and proteomic material for downstream processing. Typical lysis methods include chemical and physical method. The chemical lysis method, which is the simplest way, uses chemical detergents or enzymes to break down membranes. The physical lysis can be achieved by using bead beating system on a disk. Lysis occurs due to collisions and shearing between the beads and the cells and through friction shearing along the lysis chamber walls.

==== ELISA/FIA ====
ELISA (enzyme-linked immunosorbent assays) and FIA (fluorescent immunoassays) are two methods of immunoassays. Immunoassays are standard tools used in clinical diagnostics. These tests rely on the specific detection of either the antibody or antigen and are commonly performed by labeling the antibody/antigen of interest through various means such as fluorescent or enzymatic labels. However, washing, mixing, and incubation always take a great deal of time. When integrated in microfluid biodisks, the detection times become extremely short and such types of tests can be widely used in this area.

In ELISA method, enzymes are used to produce a detectable signal from an antibody–antigen complex. At the first step, any antigen present will bind to capture antibodies which have been coated on the channel's surface. Then, detecting antibodies added to bind to the antigen. The enzyme-linked secondary antibody follows the detecting antibodies and binds to them. Finally, when substrate is added, it will be converted by enzyme to a detectable form. Base on this principle, Sergi Morais achieved multiplexed microimmunoassays on a digital versatile disk. This multiplexed assay could achieve detection limits (IC10) of 0.06μg/L and sensitivities of (IC50) 0.54μg/L.

In addition to typical ELISA assays, fluorescent immunoassays (FIA) are also introduced on a centrifugal microfluidic device. The principle of FIA is almost the same with ELISA; the most significant difference is that fluorescence labels are used instead of enzymes.

==== Nucleic acid analysis ====
Nucleic acid sensing using gene-specific nucleic acid amplification with a fluorescence dye or a probe, nucleic acid microarrays, such as DNA microarrays, have become important tools for genetic analysis, gene expression profiling, and genetic-based diagnostics. In the gene-specific nucleic acid amplification, standard PCR or isothermal amplification, such as loop-mediated isothermal amplification (LAMP), is used to amplify the target genetic marker with the DNA-binding fluorescence dye or a sequence-specific probe is applied for signal generation. The fluorescence can be detected in a modified CD/DVD drive or a disc device.

In the nucleic acid microarrays, the process of probe immobilization and signal amplification can be separated into five steps. The surface of the micro-channel is first irradiated with UV light in the presence of ozone to produce a hydrophilic surface with a high density of carboxylic acid groups (step 1). Then, the probe molecules (biotin, DNA, or human plasma IgG) are covalently attached to the polycarbon surface via amide coupling (step 2). Later, the target molecules are labeled with fluorescent tags and this biotin-labeled target DNA is hybridized with the probe DNA immobilized on the disk (step 3). Subsequently, gold nanoparticles are bonded with the target via streptavidin conjugate (step 4). Silver is then deposited onto the gold “seed” (step 5) to increase the particle size from a few to several hundred nanometers. The amplification of fluorescence will be detected by the detection system in the CD drive.

=== Signal receiving ===
The detection system should be completed by the signal receiving component. There are roughly three types of systems which can be used for detecting. The first is hardware and software modification, which means the CD/DVD drive should be modified and the software should also be developed at the same time. This type will cause superfluous labor and expenses and may not be versatile in developing countries or indigenous areas. The second type is software modification with standard hardware, which means that the detection can be achieved by developing dedicated interpretation software on platforms such as C++ without making any changes to hardware. The third is standard hardware and existing software, which means that the detection can be realized simply by using the existing equipment. Manu Pallapa described a new protocol to read and quantify biotin–streptavidin binding assays with a standard optical drive by using a current CD-data analysis software (IsoBuster) successfully. The latter two types are both considerable when coming across different situations.

No matter which type of detection system one uses, the reading method is an important factor. There are mainly two reading methods, which are AAS (acquired analog signals) and ERD (error reading detection). In the AAS method, to determine multianalytes on a DVD, the analog signals acquired directly from the photodiode of a CD/DVD drive correlate well with the optical density of the reaction products. The ERD method is based on the analysis of reading errors. It can use the same digital versatile disk and a standard DVD drive without any supplementary hardware.

==== ERD ====
In the ERD method, the position and level of the resulting reading error correspond to the physical location and the intensity of the bioassay signal, respectively. The errors are then compared with a perfectly recorded CD to identify the time when one certain error was read out. There are several free CD-quality diagnostic programs, such as PlexTools Professional, Kprobe, and CD-DVD Speed, which can be used to access the error-statistic information in a CD/DVD drive and to generate a plot displaying the variation of the block error rate as function of playtime. In a typical 700-MB CD-R containing 79.7 minutes of audio data, for example, the radius that error occurs can be calculated from the following equation:

$r=\sqrt{{t \over 79.7} (58^2-25^2)+ 25^2}$

t is the reading time and r is the radius location.

==== AAS ====
In the AAS method, the set of servo systems (focus, tracking, sled, and spindle servos) keeps the laser beam focused on the spiral track and allows disc rotation and laser head motion during the scanning. The amplification/detection board (DAB) is integrated into the CD/DVD drive unit and incorporates a photosensor and electronic circuitry to amplify the RF signal extracted from the photodiode transducer. The photosensor generates a trigger signal when detecting the trigger mark. Both signals are brought to the USB2.0 data acquisition board (DAQ) for digitization and quantification.

== See also ==
- lab on a chip
- point-of-care testing
- diagnostic testing
- MEMS
- Immunoassay
