= Total analysis system =

The term total analysis system (TAS) describes a device that combines and automates all necessary steps for the chemical analysis of a sample (e.g., sampling, sample transport, filtration, dilution, chemical reactions, separation, and detection). Most current total analysis systems are micro total analysis systems (μTAS) which utilize the principles of microfluidics.

Total analysis systems are designed to shrink the processes carried out in a laboratory to a chip-sized lab-on-a-chip. Due to this, it can be more cost-effective to carry out complex tests when considering chip technologies, sample sizes, and analysis time. Total analysis systems can also reduce the exposure of toxic chemicals for lab personnel. This technology can also be used in point-of-care testing or point-of-use diagnostics, which do not require skilled technicians.

== See also ==
- Microelectromechanical systems
- Microfluidics
- Bio-MEMS
- Lab-on-a-chip
