= Micropatterning =

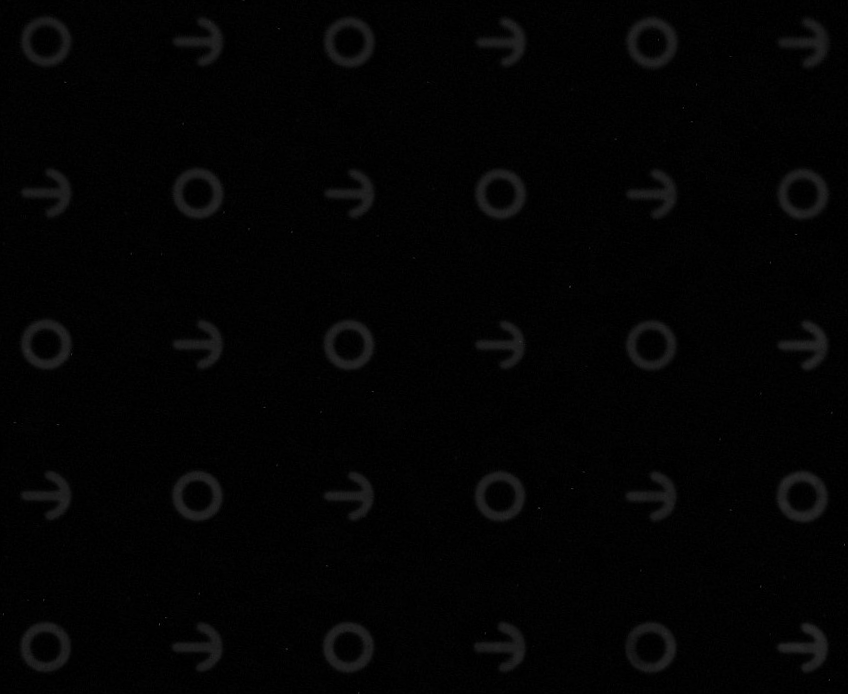
Micropatterns of fluorescent fibronectin on glass surface

Micropatterning is the art of miniaturisation of patterns. Especially used for electronics, it has recently become a standard in biomaterials engineering and for fundamental research on cellular biology by mean of soft lithography. It generally uses photolithography methods but many techniques have been developed.

In cellular biology, micropatterns can be used to control the geometry of adhesion and substrate rigidity. This tool helped scientists to discover how the environment influences processes such as the orientation of the cell division axis, organelle positioning, cytoskeleton rearrangement cell differentiation and directionality of cell migration. Micropatterns can be made on a wide range of substrates, from glass to polyacrylamide and polydimethylsiloxane (PDMS). The polyacrylamide and PDMS in particular come into handy because they let scientists specifically regulate the stiffness of the substrate, and they allow researchers to measure cellular forces (traction force microscopy). Advanced custom micropatterning allow precise and relatively rapid experiments controlling cell adhesion, cell migration, guidance, 3D confinement and microfabrication of microstructured chips. Using advanced tools, protein patterns can be produced in virtually unlimited numbers (2D/ 3D shapes and volumes).

Nanopatterning of proteins has been achieved through using top-down lithography techniques.

Aerosol micropatterning for biomaterials uses spray microscopic characteristics to obtain semi-random patterns particularly well adapted for biomaterials.
