= Light-addressable potentiometric sensor =

Sensor that uses light to select what to measure

A light-addressable potentiometric sensor (LAPS) is a sensor that uses light (e.g. LEDs) to select what will be measured. Light can activate carriers in semiconductors.

== History ==
An example is the pH-sensitive LAPS (range pH4 to pH10) that uses LEDs in combination with (semi-conducting) silicon and pH-sensitive Ta_{2}O_{5} (SiO_{2}; Si_{3}N_{4}) insulator. The LAPS has several advantages over other types of chemical sensors. The sensor surface is completely flat, no structures, wiring or passivation are required. At the same time, the "light-addressability" of the LAPS makes it possible to obtain a spatially resolved map of the distribution of the ion concentration in the specimen. The spatial resolution of the LAPS is an important factor and is determined by the beam size and the lateral diffusion of photocarries in the semiconductor substrate. By illuminating parts of the semiconductor surface, electron-hole pairs are generated and a photocurrent flows. The LAPS is a semiconductor based chemical sensor with an electrolyte-insulator-semiconductor (EIS) structure. Under a fixed bias voltage, the AC (kHz range) photocurrent signal varies depending on the solution. A two-dimensional mapping of the surface from the LAPS is possible by using a scanning laser beam.
