= Hydrodynamic trapping =

Method of isolating particles in an aqueous solution

In microfluidics, hydrodynamic trapping is a technique for trapping very small particles in an aqueous solution for a long period of time in order to isolate particles and observe their behavior.

== Microfluidics ==
Hydrodynamic trapping is advantageous in microfluidics. Other trapping devices utilize acoustic, electric, magnetic, and optical fields for trapping. This device uses solely hydrodynamic flow. Since it does not utilize acoustic, electric, magnetic, or optical fields, the particles being studied do not need to possess chemical or physical characteristics that cater to these fields. Instead, hydrodynamic trapping is universal and can be used on any particles. Hydrodynamic traps are able to confine small nanoparticles. This is because the hydrodynamic trapping force is closely related to radius of a particle, whereas alternate trapping methods are more closely related to volume of a particle. These traps are stable and they allow for precise control of environmental factors. This means that if a specific nanoparticle in a solution is desired for study, this nanoparticle can be trapped in concentrated sample suspensions. The surrounding medium in the trap can be easily controlled. In addition to the previously mentioned advantages of using hydrodynamic trapping, hydrodynamic trapping is also a relatively low cost trapping method, and it is very easy to use and analyze. It is also simple and inexpensive to incorporate into existing soft lithography based microfluidic systems.

=== Devices ===
The first step in creating the microfluidic devices used for hydrodynamic trapping is to create an SU-8 mold. From this mold, a device can be made from PDMS. A completed device consists of two layers, a control layer and a fluidic layer. The control layer contains a valve to regulate the flow of the aqueous solution under study. The fluidic layer contains the channels for the aqueous solution to travel through. Many devices have a cross slot where two opposing laminar streams converge. This creates planar extensional flow with a point where velocity becomes zero, which is known as the fluid stagnation point. Upon analyzing a fluid with beads, DNA, or other very small particles under a microscope, the trajectories of the particles and the stagnation point can be determined.

=== Biomedical applications ===
Microfluidic hydrodynamic has up and coming applications in medicine, especially in point of care diagnostics. Hydrodynamic trapping allows isolation of a target cell from an aqueous mixture. Several advantages exist for the use of hydrodynamic trapping as a separation technique, including: higher processing rates, less use of samples, better spatial resolution, and cost efficiency. The way target cells are separated in a solution depends on several types of effects. The first is inertial effects. The inertia in laminar flow can cause cross streamline migration of particles in solution. The inertial effects are related to the Reynolds number. Another effect is viscoelastic focusing in non-Newtonian fluids. This effect accounts for directions of migration in different particles and is based on properties of polymeric fluids. Another effect is deformability of a particle. This can lead to deformability-selective cell separation. This technique is especially useful to identify cancerous cells, which are more deformable than healthy cells from the same part of the body. Another method is vorticity induced trapping. This is especially useful for high throughput situations and situations where there is a large difference between the target cells or particles and the other particles in a solution. The vortices can be created by modifying the geometry of channels.

=== Lipid bilayers ===
Hydrodynamic trapping can also be used to trap and study molecules in lipid bilayers. This is done using hydrodynamic drag forces that are created by a fluid flow through a very small cone shaped pipet located about one micrometer away from the lipid bilayer. This allows particles protruding from the lipid bilayer to be trapped and studied.

== Mineral trapping ==
Hydrodynamic trapping can be used on a more macroscopic scale for mineral trapping. It can be used to store CO_{2} in geothermal reservoirs. Geothermal energy can result in large emissions of CO_{2} into the atmosphere. Hydronamic trapping allows CO_{2} to be converted into CaCO_{3}. CaCO_{3} is geochemically stable.
