= Lab-on-a-chip =

Device integrating laboratory functions on an integrated circuit

A lab-on-a-chip (LOC) is a device that integrates one or several laboratory functions on a single integrated circuit (commonly called a "chip") of only square millimeters to a few square centimeters to achieve automation and high-throughput screening. LOCs can handle extremely small fluid volumes down to less than pico-liters.

Lab-on-a-chip devices are a subset of microelectromechanical systems (MEMS) devices and sometimes called micro total analysis systems (μTAS). LOCs may use microfluidics (the physics, manipulation and study of minute amounts of fluids). However, strictly regarded "lab-on-a-chip" indicates generally the scaling of single or multiple lab processes down to chip-format, whereas μTAS is dedicated to the integration of the total sequence of lab processes to perform chemical analysis.

== History ==
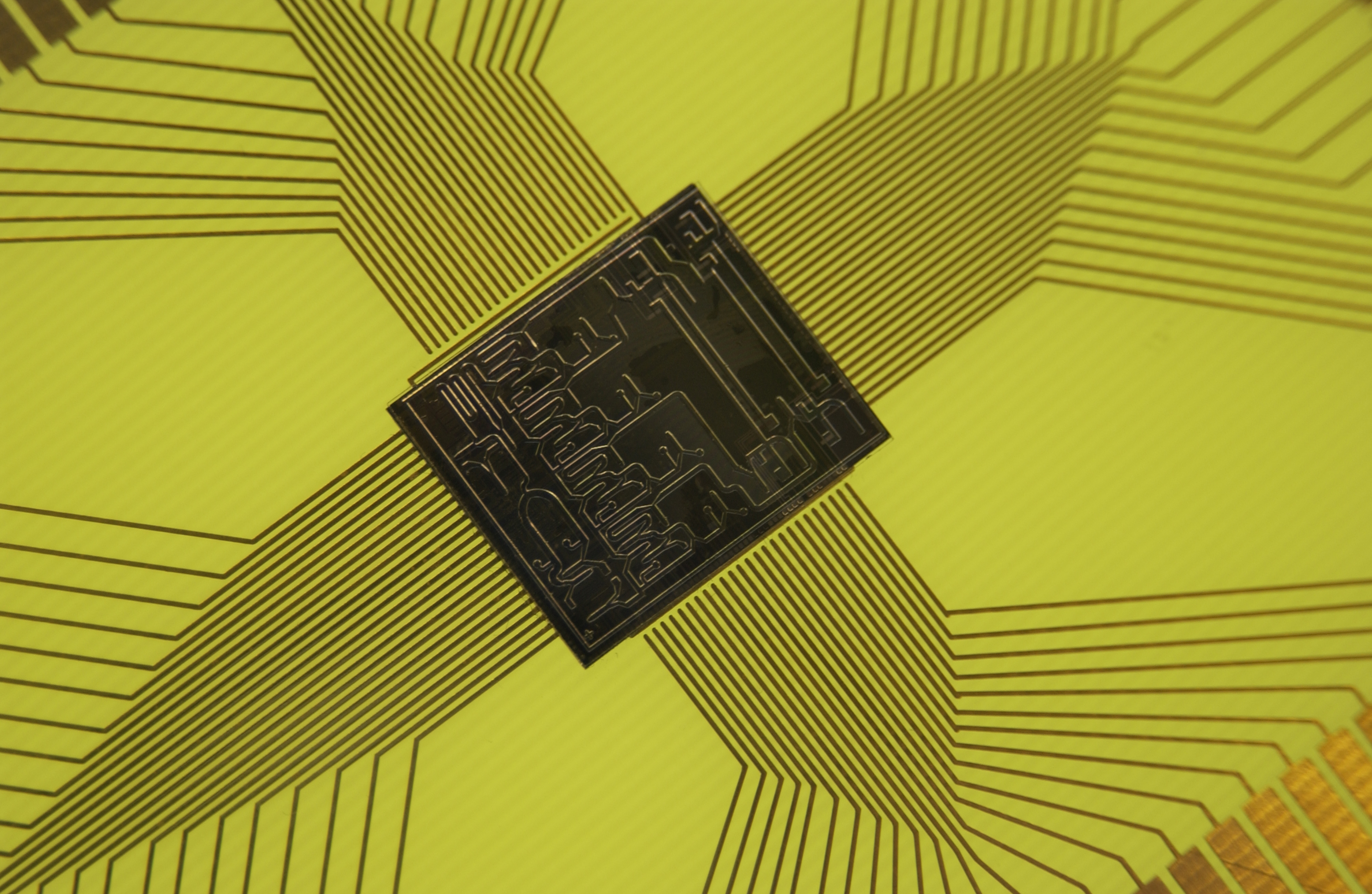
Microelectromechanical systems chip, sometimes called "lab on a chip"

After the invention of microtechnology (≈1954) for realizing integrated semiconductor structures for microelectronic chips, these lithography-based technologies were soon applied in pressure sensor manufacturing (1966) as well. Due to further development of these usually CMOS-compatibility limited processes, a tool box became available to create micrometre or sub-micrometre sized mechanical structures in silicon wafers as well: the microelectromechanical systems (MEMS) era had started.

Next to pressure sensors, airbag sensors and other mechanically movable structures, fluid handling devices were developed. Examples are: channels (capillary connections), mixers, valves, pumps and dosing devices. The first LOC analysis system was a gas chromatograph, developed in 1979 by S.C. Terry at Stanford University. However, only at the end of the 1980s and beginning of the 1990s did the LOC research start to seriously grow as a few research groups in Europe developed micropumps, flowsensors and the concepts for integrated fluid treatments for analysis systems. These μTAS concepts demonstrated that integration of pre-treatment steps, usually done at lab-scale, could extend the simple sensor functionality towards a complete laboratory analysis, including additional cleaning and separation steps.

A big boost in research and commercial interest came in the mid-1990s, when μTAS technologies turned out to provide interesting tooling for genomics applications, like capillary electrophoresis and DNA microarrays. A big boost in research support also came from the military, especially from DARPA (Defense Advanced Research Projects Agency), for their interest in portable systems to aid in the detection of biological and chemical warfare agents. The added value was not only limited to integration of lab processes for analysis but also the characteristic possibilities of individual components and the application to other, non-analysis, lab processes. Hence the term "lab-on-a-chip" was introduced.

Although the application of LOCs is still novel and modest, a growing interest of companies and applied research groups is observed in different fields such as chemical analysis, environmental monitoring, medical diagnostics and cellomics, but also in synthetic chemistry such as rapid screening and microreactors for pharmaceutics. Besides further application developments, research in LOC systems is expected to extend towards downscaling of fluid handling structures as well, by using nanotechnology. Sub-micrometre and nano-sized channels, DNA labyrinths, single cell detection and analysis, and nano-sensors, might become feasible, allowing new ways of interaction with biological species and large molecules. Many books have been written that cover various aspects of these devices, including the fluid transport, system properties, sensing techniques, and bioanalytical applications.

The size of the global lab on chip market was estimated at US$5,698 million in 2021 and is projected to increase to US$14,772 million by 2030, at a CAGR of 11.5% from 2022 to 2030

== Chip materials and fabrication technologies ==
The basis for most LOC fabrication processes is photolithography. Initially most processes were in silicon, as these well-developed technologies were directly derived from semiconductor fabrication. Because of demands for e.g. specific optical characteristics, bio- or chemical compatibility, lower production costs and faster prototyping, new processes have been developed such as glass, ceramics and metal etching, deposition and bonding, polydimethylsiloxane (PDMS) processing (e.g., soft lithography), Off-stoichiometry thiol-ene polymers (OSTEmer) processing, thick-film- and stereolithography-based 3D printing as well as fast replication methods via electroplating, injection molding and embossing. The demand for cheap and easy LOC prototyping resulted in a simple methodology for the fabrication of PDMS microfluidic devices: ESCARGOT (Embedded SCAffold RemovinG Open Technology). This technique allows for the creation of microfluidic channels, in a single block of PDMS, via a dissolvable scaffold (made by e.g. 3D printing). Furthermore, the LOC field more and more exceeds the borders between lithography-based microsystem technology, nanotechnology and precision engineering. Printing is considered as a well-established yet maturing method for rapid prototyping in chip fabrication.

The development of LOC devices using printed circuit board (PCB) substrates is an interesting alternative due to these differentiating characteristics: commercially available substrates with integrated electronics, sensors and actuators; disposable devices at low cost, and very high potential of commercialization. These devices are known as Lab-on-PCBs (LOPCBs). The following are some of the advantages of PCB technology: a) PCB-based circuit design offers great flexibility and can be tailored to specific demands. b) PCB technology enables the integration of electronic and sensing modules on the same platform, reducing device size while maintaining accuracy of detection. c) The standardized and established PCB manufacturing process allows for cost-effective large-scale production of PCB-based detection devices. d) The growth of flexible PCB technology has driven the development of wearable detection devices. As a result, over the past decade, there have been numerous reports on the application of Lab-on-PCB to various biomedical fields, including the fastest SARS-CoV-2 molecular diagnostic test. e) PCBs are compatible with wet deposition methods, to allow for the fabrication of sensors using novel nanomaterials (e.g. graphene).

== Advantages ==
LOCs may provide advantages, which are specific to their application. Typical advantages are:

- low fluid volumes consumption (less waste, lower reagents costs and less required sample volumes for diagnostics)
- faster analysis and response times due to short diffusion distances, fast heating, high surface to volume ratios, small heat capacities.
- better process control because of a faster response of the system (e.g. thermal control for exothermic chemical reactions)
- compactness of the systems due to integration of much functionality and small volumes
- massive parallelization due to compactness, which allows high-throughput analysis
- lower fabrication costs, allowing cost-effective disposable chips, fabricated in mass production
- part quality may be verified automatically
- safer platform for chemical, radioactive or biological studies because of integration of functionality, smaller fluid volumes and stored energies

== Disadvantages ==
The most prominent disadvantages of labs-on-chip are:

- The micro-manufacturing process required to make them is complex and labor-intensive, requiring both expensive equipment and specialized personnel. It can be overcome by the recent technology advancement on low-cost 3D printing and laser engraving.
- The complex fluidic actuation network requires multiple pumps and connectors, where fine control is difficult. It can be overcome by careful simulation, an intrinsic pump, such as air-bag embed chip, or by using a centrifugal force to replace the pumping, i.e. centrifugal micro-fluidic biochip.
- Most LOCs are novel proof of concept application that are not yet fully developed for widespread use. More validations are needed before practical employment.
- In the microliter scale that LOCs deal with, surface dependent effects like capillary forces, surface roughness or chemical interactions are more dominant. This can sometimes make replicating lab processes in LOCs quite challenging and more complex than in conventional lab equipment.
- Detection principles may not always scale down in a positive way, leading to low signal-to-noise ratios.

== Global health ==
Lab-on-a-chip technology may soon become an important part of efforts to improve global health, particularly through the development of point-of-care testing devices. In countries with few healthcare resources, infectious diseases that would be treatable in a developed nation are often deadly. In some cases, poor healthcare clinics have the drugs to treat a certain illness but lack the diagnostic tools to identify patients who should receive the drugs. Many researchers believe that LOC technology may be the key to powerful new diagnostic instruments. The goal of these researchers is to create microfluidic chips that will allow healthcare providers in poorly equipped clinics to perform diagnostic tests such as microbiological culture assays, immunoassays and nucleic acid assays with no laboratory support.

=== Global challenges ===
For the chips to be used in areas with limited resources, many challenges must be overcome. In developed nations, the most highly valued traits for diagnostic tools include speed, sensitivity, and specificity; but in countries where the healthcare infrastructure is less well developed, attributes such as ease of use and shelf life must also be considered. The reagents that come with the chip, for example, must be designed so that they remain effective for months even if the chip is not kept in a climate controlled environment. Chip designers must also keep cost, scalability, and recyclability in mind as they choose what materials and fabrication techniques to use.

=== Examples of global LOC application ===
One of the most prominent and well known LOC devices to reach the market is the at home pregnancy test kit, a device that utilizes paper-based microfluidics technology.

Another active area of LOC research involves ways to diagnose and manage common infectious diseases caused by bacteria, e.g. bacteriuria, or viruses, e.g. influenza. A gold standard for diagnosing bacteriuria (urinary tract infections) is microbial culture. A recent study based on lab-on-a-chip technology, Digital Dipstick, miniaturised microbiological culture into a dipstick format and enabled it to be used at the point-of-care. Lab-on-a-chip technology can also be useful for the diagnosis and management of viral infections. In 2023, researchers developed a working prototype of an RT-LAMP lab-on-a-chip system called LoCKAmp, which provided results for SARS-CoV-2 tests within three minutes. Managing HIV infections is another area where lab-on-a-chips may be useful. Around 36.9 million people are infected with HIV in the world today, and 59% of these people receive anti-retroviral treatment. Only 75% of people living with HIV knew their status. Measuring the number of CD4+ T lymphocytes in a person's blood is an accurate way to determine if a person has HIV and to track the progress of an HIV infection. At the moment, flow cytometry is the gold standard for obtaining CD4 counts, but flow cytometry is a complicated technique that is not available in most developing areas because it requires trained technicians and expensive equipment. Recently such a cytometer was developed for just $5. Another active area of LOC research is for controlled separation and mixing. In such devices it is possible to quickly diagnose and potentially treat diseases. As mentioned above, a big motivation for development of these is that they can potentially be manufactured at very low cost. One more area of research that is being looked into with regards to LOC is with home security. Automated monitoring of volatile organic compounds (VOCs) is a desired functionality for LOC. If this application becomes reliable, these micro-devices could be installed on a global scale and notify homeowners of potentially dangerous compounds.

== Plant sciences ==
Lab-on-a-chip devices could be used to characterize pollen tube guidance in Arabidopsis thaliana. Specifically, plant on a chip is a miniaturized device in which pollen tissues and ovules could be incubated for plant sciences studies.

== See also ==
- Biochemical assays
- Dielectrophoresis: detection of cancer cells and bacteria.
- Immunoassay: detect bacteria, viruses and cancers based on antigen-antibody reactions.
- Ion channel screening (patch clamp)
- Microfluidics
- Microphysiometry
- Organ-on-a-chip
- Real-time PCR: detection of bacteria, viruses and cancers.
- Testing the safety and efficacy of new drugs, as with lung on a chip
- Total analysis system
