= Miniaturization =

Trend to manufacture ever smaller products and devices

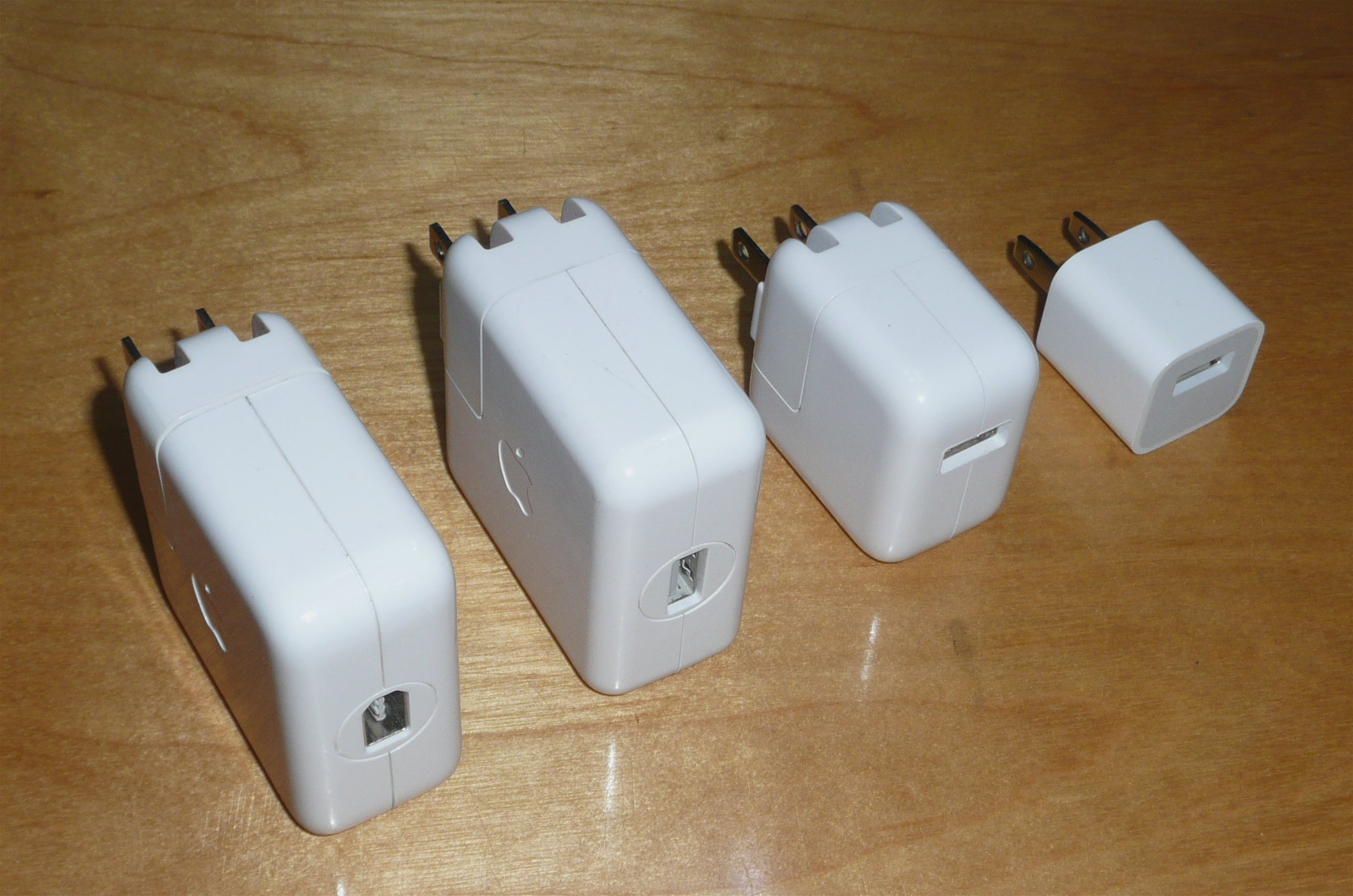
Battery chargers for successive generations of Apple's iPod

Miniaturization is the trend to manufacture ever-smaller mechanical, optical, and electronic products and devices. Examples include miniaturization of mobile phones, computers and vehicle engine downsizing. In electronics, the exponential scaling and miniaturization of silicon MOSFETs (MOS transistors) leads to the number of transistors on an integrated circuit chip doubling every two years, an observation known as Moore's law. This leads to MOS integrated circuits such as microprocessors and memory chips being built with increasing transistor density, faster performance, and lower power consumption, enabling the miniaturization of electronic devices.

== Electronic circuits ==
The history of miniaturization is associated with the history of information technology based on the succession of switching devices, each smaller, faster, and cheaper than its predecessor. During the period referred to as the Second Industrial Revolution (c. 1870–1914), miniaturization was confined to two-dimensional electronic circuits used for the manipulation of information. This orientation is demonstrated in the use of vacuum tubes in the first general-purpose computers. The technology gave way to the development of transistors in the 1950s and then the integrated circuit (IC) approach which followed.

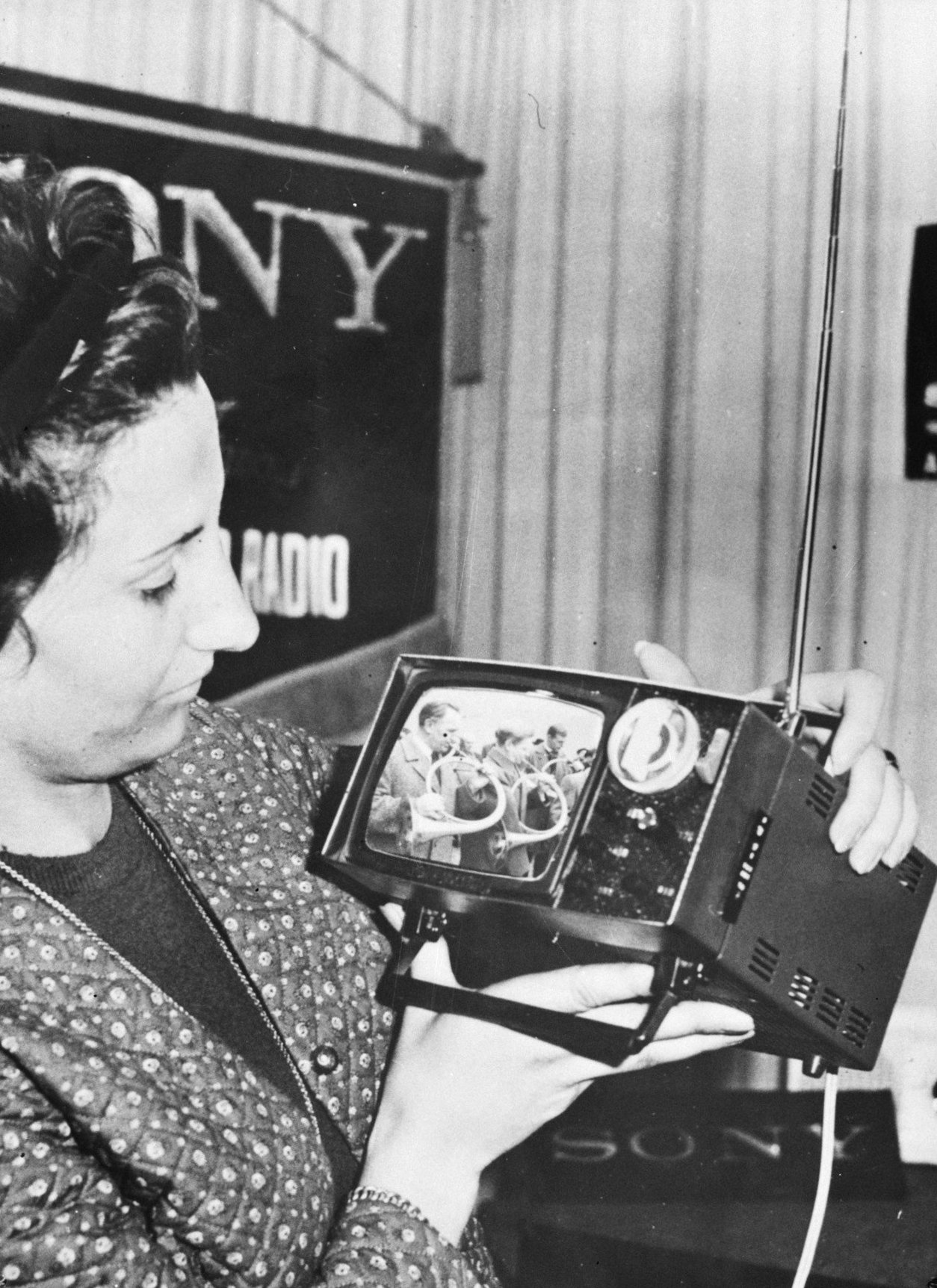
Demonstrating a miniature television device in 1963.

The MOSFET was invented at Bell Labs between 1955 and 1960. It was the first truly compact transistor that could be miniaturized and mass-produced for a wide range of uses, due to its high scalability and low power consumption, leading to increasing transistor density. This made it possible to build high-density IC chips, with reduced cost-per-transistor as transistor density increased.

In the early 1960s, Gordon Moore, who later founded Intel, recognized that the ideal electrical and scaling characteristics of MOSFET devices would lead to rapidly increasing integration levels and unparalleled growth in electronic applications. Moore's law, which he described in 1965, and which was later named after him, predicted that the number of transistors on an IC for minimum component cost would double every 18 months. In 1974, Robert H. Dennard at IBM recognized the rapid MOSFET scaling technology and formulated the related Dennard scaling rule. Moore described the development of miniaturization during the 1975 International Electron Devices Meeting, confirming his earlier predictions.

By 2004, electronics companies were producing silicon IC chips with switching MOSFETs that had feature size as small as 130 nanometers (nm) and development was also underway for chips a few nanometers in size through the nanotechnology initiative. The focus is to make components smaller to increase the number that can be integrated into a single wafer and this required critical innovations, which include increasing wafer size, the development of sophisticated metal connections between the chip's circuits, and improvement in the polymers used for masks (photoresists) in the photolithography processes. These last two are the areas where miniaturization has moved into the nanometer range.

== Other fields ==
Miniaturization became a trend in the last fifty years and came to cover not just electronic but also mechanical devices. The process for miniaturizing mechanical devices is more complex due to the way the structural properties of mechanical parts change as they are reduced in scale. It has been said that the so-called Third Industrial Revolution (1969 – c. 2015) is based on economically viable technologies that can shrink three-dimensional objects.

In medical technology, engineers and designers have been exploring miniaturization to shrink components to the micro and nanometer range. Smaller devices can have lower cost, be made more portable (e.g.: for ambulances), and allow simpler and less invasive medical procedures.

== See also ==
- Microtechnology
- Nanotechnology
