= Pinch-off voltage =

Pinch-off voltage may refer to one of two different characteristics of a transistor:

- in insulated-gate field-effect transistors (IGFET), "pinch-off" refers to the channel pinching that leads to current saturation behaviour under high source–drain bias.
- in junction field-effect transistors (JFETs), "pinch-off" refers to the threshold voltage below which the transistor turns off.
- the pinch off voltage is the value of Vds when drain current reaches constant saturation value
