= Reverse short-channel effect =

Electrical effect present in MOSFET circuits

In MOSFETs, reverse short-channel effect (RSCE) is an increase of threshold voltage with decreasing channel length; this is the opposite of the usual short-channel effect. The difference comes from changes in doping profiles used in modern small device manufacturing.

RSCE is a result of non-uniform channel doping (halo doping ) in modern processes. To combat drain-induced barrier lowering (DIBL), MOSFET substrate near source and drain region are heavily doped (p+ in case of NMOS and n+ in case of PMOS) to reduce the width of the depletion region in the vicinity of source/substrate and drain/substrate junctions (called halo doping to describe the limitation of this heavy doping to the immediate vicinity of the junctions). At short channel lengths the halo doping of the source overlaps that of the drain, increasing the substrate doping concentration in the channel area, and thus increasing the threshold voltage. This increased threshold voltage requires a larger gate voltage for channel inversion. However, as channel length is increased, the halo doped regions become separated and the doping mid-channel approaches a lower background level dictated by the body doping. This reduction in average channel doping concentration means V_{th} initially is reduced as channel length increases, but approaches a constant value independent of channel length for large enough lengths.

== See also ==
- Short-channel effect
