= Norton amplifier =

Current controlled voltage source electronic circuit

A Norton amplifier or current differencing amplifier (CDA) is an electronic amplifier with two low impedance current inputs and one low impedance voltage output where the output voltage is proportional to the difference between the two input currents. It is a current controlled voltage source (CCVS) controlled by the difference of two input currents.

The Norton amplifier can be regarded as the dual of the operational transconductance amplifier (OTA) which takes a differential voltage input and provides a high impedance current output. The OTA has a gain measured in units of transconductance (siemens) whereas the Norton amplifier has a gain measured in units of transimpedance (ohms).

A commercial example of this circuit is the LM3900 quad operational amplifier and its high speed cousin the LM359 (400MHz gain bandwidth product).

The LM3900 was introduced in the mid 1970s, and was designed to be an easy-to-use single supply op amp with comparable input bias currents (~30nA) to other bi polar op-amps of the time period (LM741, LM324), while having rail to rail output and a much higher gain bandwidth product(2.5MHz). The LM3900 was popular with designers of analog synthesizers. The LM359 was introduced in the early 1990s as video capable amplifier capable of high amplification at video frequencies (10MHz).

== See also ==
- Current differencing transconductance amplifier, current difference input and differential current output
- Current-feedback operational amplifier, single-ended current input and voltage output.

== Bibliography ==
- Carr, Joseph, Linear Integrated Circuits, Newnes, 1996 ISBN 0750625910.
- Bali, S.P., Linear Integrated Circuits, Tata McGraw-Hill Education, 2008 ISBN 0070648077.
- Terrell, David, Op Amps: Design, Application, and Troubleshooting, Newnes, 1996 ISBN 0750697024.
- T. M. Frederiksen, W. F. Davis and D. W. Zobel, A new current-differencing single-supply operational amplifier, in IEEE Journal of Solid-State Circuits, vol. 6, no. 6, pp. 340-347, Dec. 1971, doi: 10.1109/JSSC.1971.1050202.
- F. Anday, Realization of the biquadratic transfer functions using current differencing amplifiers, in Proceedings of the IEEE, vol. 65, no. 7, pp. 1067-1068, July 1977, doi: 10.1109/PROC.1977.10617.
- J. H. Brodie, A low-pass biquad derived filter realization, in IEEE Journal of Solid-State Circuits, vol. 11, no. 4, pp. 552-555, Aug. 1976, doi: 10.1109/JSSC.1976.1050775.
- C. Croskey and J. H. Brodie, Comments on "A low-pass biquad derived filter realization", in IEEE Journal of Solid-State Circuits, vol. 12, no. 3, pp. 329-330, June 1977, doi: 10.1109/JSSC.1977.1050907.
- J. W. Haslett, Noise performance of the new Norton op amps, in IEEE Transactions on Electron Devices, vol. 21, no. 9, pp. 571-577, Sept. 1974, doi: 10.1109/T-ED.1974.17968.
- J. W. Haslett, Noise performance limitations of single amplifiers RC active filters, in IEEE Transactions on Circuits and Systems, vol. 22, no. 9, pp. 743-747, September 1975, doi: 10.1109/TCS.1975.1084117.
