= RDF =

RDF may refer to:

== Science and technology ==
=== Computing ===
- Resource Description Framework, a W3C metadata standard used for graphing
  - RDF Schema, its language

=== Physics ===
- Radial distribution function, describes how density varies as a function of distance from a reference particle
- Radio direction finding, techniques used when searching for radio sources
- Random dopant fluctuation
- Reduced dimensions form, a canonical mechanism for solving two-state trajectories
- Relative directivity factor, a figure of merit for directional receiving antennas

=== Other technologies ===
- Real degree of fermentation, attenuation of alcoholic beverages
- Refuse-derived fuel

== Art, entertainment, and media ==
- Radical Dance Faction, a band from the United Kingdom
- RDF Media, a television production company
- Robotech Defense Force, a character group in the US anime television series Robotech
- Rapid Deployment Force: Global Conflict, a video game

== Military ==
- Reserve Defence Forces, the combined military reserve force of Ireland
- Rwandan Defence Forces
- Rapid Deployment Force (United States)

== Other organizations ==
- Reichsbund Deutsche Familie, Kampfbund für erbtüchtigen Kinderreichtum, a German Nazi organisation
- Richard Dawkins Foundation for Reason and Science, UK

== Other uses ==
- Reality distortion field, a term coined to describe Steve Jobs' charisma
