= Subthreshold slope =

Feature of a MOSFET's current–voltage characteristic

The subthreshold slope is a feature of a MOSFET's current–voltage characteristic.

In the subthreshold region, the drain current behaviour—though being controlled by the gate terminal—is similar to the exponentially decreasing current of a forward biased diode. Therefore, a plot of drain current versus gate voltage with drain, source, and bulk voltages fixed will exhibit approximately log-linear behaviour in this MOSFET operating regime. Its slope is the subthreshold slope.

The subthreshold slope is also the reciprocal value of the subthreshold swing S_{s-th} which is usually given as:

$S_{s-th} = \ln(10) {kT \over q}\left(1+{C_d \over C_{ox}}\right)$

$C_d$ = depletion layer capacitance

$C_{ox}$ = gate-oxide capacitance

${kT \over q}$ = thermal voltage

The minimum subthreshold swing of a conventional device can be found by letting $\textstyle {C_{d}} \rightarrow 0$ and/or $\textstyle {C_{ox}} \rightarrow \infty$, which yield $S_{s-th, \min} = \ln(10) {kT \over q}$(known as thermionic limit) and 60 mV/dec at room temperature (300 K). A typical experimental subthreshold swing for a scaled MOSFET at room temperature is ~70 mV/dec, slightly degraded due to short-channel MOSFET parasitics.

A dec (decade) corresponds to a 10 times increase of the drain current I_{D}.

A device characterized by steep subthreshold slope exhibits a faster transition between off (low current) and on (high current) states.
