= CDBA =

CDBA can mean:

- Clearance Diver's Breathing Apparatus, types of naval diver's rebreather:
  - Siebe Gorman CDBA
  - Carleton CDBA
- common data bus architecture' in computers.
- 'Current differencing buffered amplifier in electronics.
- Centro de Big Data e Analytics - an analytics team.
- Cannabidiolic acid

== Dragon boat associations ==
- California Dragon Boat Association - the Governing Body for Dragon Boat Racing in California.
- Chinese Dragon Boat Association - the National Governing Body for Dragon Boat Racing in China.
- Canberra Dragon Boat Association - the dragon boat body for the Australian Capital Territory.
