= Current-feedback operational amplifier =

Type of electronic amplifier

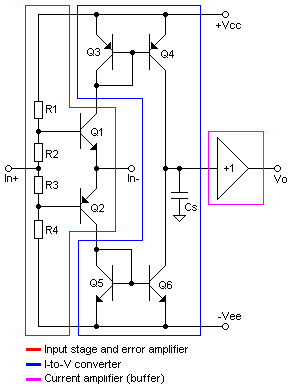
Representative schematic of a current-feedback op-amp or amplifier.

The current-feedback operational amplifier (CFOA or CFA) is a type of electronic amplifier whose inverting input is sensitive to current, rather than to voltage as in a conventional voltage-feedback operational amplifier (VFOA or VFA). It excels in high speed and low distortion, because currents can be switched faster than voltages in bipolar junction transistor (BJT) circuits.

CFAs are usually produced with the same pin arrangements as VFAs, allowing the two types to be interchanged without rewiring when the circuit design allows. In simple configurations, such as linear amplifiers, a CFA can be used in place of a VFA with no circuit modifications, but in other cases, such as integrators, a different circuit design is required. The classic four-resistor differential amplifier configuration also works with a CFA, but the common-mode rejection ratio is poorer than that from a VFA.

== History ==
One CFA was invented by David Nelson at Comlinear Corporation, and first sold in 1982 as a hybrid amplifier, the CLC103. An early patent covering a CFA is U.S. patent 4,502,020, David Nelson and Kenneth Saller (filed in 1983). Although various patents have been issued, the fundamental concepts were established decades earlier — a 1937 article by Frederick Terman and a 1941 circuit by Stewart E. Miller used current feedback with vacuum tubes, and a 1965 Bell Labs fast-settling op amp for high-speed analog-to-digital converters used transistors. The integrated circuit CFAs were introduced in 1987 by both Comlinear and Elantec (designer Bill Gross).

== Operation ==
Referring to the schematic shown, the section marked in red forms the input stage and error amplifier. The inverting input (node where emitters of Q1 & Q2 are connected) is low-impedance and hence sensitive to changes in current. Resistors R1–R4 set up the quiescent bias conditions and are chosen such that the collector currents of Q1 & Q2 are the same. In most designs, active biasing circuitry is used instead of passive resistive biasing, and the non-inverting input may also be modified to become low impedance like the inverting input to minimise offsets.

With no signal applied, due to the current mirrors Q3/Q4 & Q5/Q6, the collector currents of Q4 and Q6 will be equal in magnitude if the collector currents of Q1 and Q2 are also equal in magnitude. Thus, no current will flow into the buffer's input (equivalently, no voltage will be present at the buffer's input). In practice, due to device mismatches, the collector currents are unequal, resulting in the difference flowing into the buffer's input and an offset at its output. This is corrected by adjusting the input bias or adding offset nulling circuitry.

The section marked in blue (Q3–Q6) forms an I-to-V converter. Any change in the collector currents of Q1 and Q2 (as a result of a signal at the non-inverting input) appears as an equivalent change in the voltage at the junction of the collectors of Q4 and Q6. C_{s} is a stability capacitor to ensure that the circuit remains stable for all operating conditions. Due to the wide open-loop bandwidth of a CFA, there is a high risk of the circuit breaking into oscillations. C_{s} attenuates frequencies where oscillations might start, especially when running with a low closed-loop gain.

The output stage (in magenta) is a buffer that provides current gain. It has a voltage gain of unity (+1 in the schematic).

== Voltage-feedback amplifier comparison ==
Internally compensated VFA bandwidth is dominated by an internal dominant pole compensation capacitor, resulting in a constant gain/bandwidth limitation. CFAs also have a dominant pole compensation capacitor, but due to using current feedback instead of voltage feedback, the resulting open loop response is different. VFA stability depends on the ratio of open loop gain to feedback gain; CFA stability depends on the ratio of open loop transimpedance to feedback resistance. VFAs have a gain/bandwidth dependence; CFAs have a transimpedance/feedback resistance dependence.

In VFAs, dynamic performance is limited by the gain-bandwidth product and the slew rate. CFAs use a circuit topology that emphasizes current-mode operation, which is inherently much faster than voltage-mode operation because it is less prone to the effect of stray node-capacitances. When fabricated using high-speed complementary bipolar processes, CFAs can be orders of magnitude faster than VFAs. This is largely due to most VFAs being compensated for stability at unity gain. Decompensated VFAs can be just as fast as CFAs. With CFAs, the amplifier gain may be controlled independently of bandwidth. This constitutes the major advantages of CFAs over conventional VFA topologies.

Disadvantages of CFAs include poorer input offset voltage and input bias current characteristics. Additionally, the DC loop gains are generally smaller by about three decimal orders of magnitude. CFAs have much higher inverting input current noise. CFA circuits must use a specific value of feedback resistance to achieve maximum performance. A lower value of feedback resistance can make the amplifier oscillate. CFA circuits must never include a direct capacitance between the output and inverting input pins as this often leads to oscillation. CFAs are ideally suited to very high speed applications with moderate accuracy requirements.

Development of faster VFAs is ongoing, and VFAs are available with gain-bandwidth products in the low UHF range at the time of this writing. However, CFAs are available with gain-bandwidth products more than an octave higher than their VFA cousins and are also capable of operating as amplifiers very near their gain-bandwidth products.

== See also ==
The current-feedback operational amplifier is a type of current controlled voltage source (CCVS).

- Transimpedance amplifier, an ideal current controlled voltage source (CCVS)
- Norton amplifier, a current controlled voltage source (CCVS) with a differential current input
- Operational amplifier and instrumentation amplifier, voltage-controlled voltage sources (VCVS)
- Operational transconductance amplifier, voltage controlled current sources (VCCS) with a differential voltage input.
