= Overdrive voltage =

Excess voltage in a MOSFET transistor

Overdrive voltage, usually abbreviated as V_{OV}, is typically referred to in the context of MOSFET transistors. The overdrive voltage is defined as the voltage between transistor gate and source (V_{GS}) in excess of the threshold voltage (V_{TH}) where V_{TH} is defined as the minimum voltage required between gate and source to turn the transistor on (allow it to conduct electricity). Due to this definition, overdrive voltage is also known as "excess gate voltage" or "effective voltage." Overdrive voltage can be found using the simple equation: V_{OV} = V_{GS} − V_{TH}.

== Technology ==
V_{OV} is important as it directly affects the output drain terminal current (I_{D}) of the transistor, an important property of amplifier circuits. By increasing V_{OV}, I_{D} can be increased until saturation is reached.

Overdrive voltage is also important because of its relationship to V_{DS}, the drain voltage relative to the source, which can be used to determine the region of operation of the MOSFET. The table below shows how to use overdrive voltage to understand what region of operation the MOSFET is in:

Conditions	Region of Operation	Description
V_{DS} > V_{OV}; V_{GS} > V_{TH}	Saturation (CCR)	The MOSFET is delivering a high amount of current, and changing V_{DS} won't do much.
V_{DS} < V_{OV}; V_{GS} > V_{TH}	Triode (Linear)	The MOSFET is delivering current in a linear relationship to the voltage (V_{DS}).
V_{GS} < V_{TH}	Cutoff	The MOSFET is turned off, and should not be delivering any current.

A more physics-related explanation follows:

In an NMOS transistor, the channel region under zero bias has an abundance of holes (i.e., it is p-type silicon). By applying a negative gate bias (V_{GS} < 0) we attract more holes, and this is called accumulation. A positive gate voltage (V_{GS} > 0) will attract electrons and repel holes, and this is called depletion because we are depleting the number of holes. At a critical voltage called the threshold voltage (V_{TH}) the channel will actually be so depleted of holes and rich in electrons that it will INVERT to being n-type silicon, and this is called the inversion region.

As we increase this voltage, V_{GS}, beyond V_{TH}, we are said to be then overdriving the gate by creating a stronger channel, hence the overdrive (often called V_{ov}, V_{od}, or V_{on}) is defined as (V_{GS} − V_{TH}).

== See also ==
- MOSFET
- Threshold voltage
- Electronic amplifier
- Short-channel effect
- Biasing
