= Random dopant fluctuation =

Random dopant fluctuation (RDF) is a form of process variation resulting from variation in the implanted impurity concentration. In MOSFET transistors, RDF in the channel region can alter the transistor's properties, especially threshold voltage. In newer process technologies RDF has a larger effect because the total number of dopants is fewer, and the addition or deletion of a few impurity atoms can significantly alter transistor properties. RDF is a local form of process variation, meaning that two neighbouring transistors may have significantly different dopant concentrations.
