= Current differencing buffered amplifier =

Block diagram of the CDBA

A current differencing buffered amplifier (CDBA) is a multi-terminal active component with two inputs and two outputs and developed by Cevdet Acar and Serdar Özoğuz. Its block diagram can be seen from the figure. It is derived from the current feedback amplifier (CFA).

== Basic operation ==
The characteristic equation of this element can be given as:

1. $Vp=Vn=0$,
2. $Iz=Ip-In$,
3. $Vw=Vz$.

Here, the current through the z-terminal follows the difference between the currents through p-terminal and n-terminal. Input terminals p and n are internally grounded. The difference of the input currents is converted into the output voltage Vw, therefore CDBA element can be considered as a special type of current feedback amplifier with differential current input and grounded y input.

The CDBA simplifies the implementation, is free from parasitic capacitances, able to operate in the frequency range of more than hundreds of MHz (even GHz), and suitable for current mode operation while it also provides a voltage output.

Several voltage and current mode continuous-time filters, oscillators, analog multipliers, inductance simulators and a PID controller have been developed using this active element.
