= Transconductance =

Electrical characteristic

Transconductance (for transfer conductance), also infrequently called mutual conductance, is the electrical characteristic relating the current through the output of a device to the voltage across the input of a device. Conductance is the reciprocal of resistance.

Transadmittance (or transfer admittance) is the AC equivalent of transconductance.

== Definition ==
Model transconductance device

Transconductance is very often denoted as a conductance, g_{m}, with a subscript, m, for mutual. It is defined as follows:

$$g_\text{m} = \frac{\Delta I_\text{out}}{\Delta V_\text{in}}$$

For small signal alternating current, the definition is simpler:

$$g_\text{m} = \frac{i_\text{out}}{v_\text{in}}$$

The SI unit for transconductance is the siemens, with the symbol S, as in conductance.

== Transresistance ==
Transresistance (for transfer resistance), also infrequently referred to as mutual resistance, is the dual of transconductance. It refers to the ratio between a change of the voltage at two output points and a related change of current through two input points, and is denotated as r_{m}:

$$r_\text{m} = \frac{\Delta V_\text{out}}{\Delta I_\text{in}}$$

The SI unit for transresistance is simply the ohm, as in resistance.

Transimpedance (or, transfer impedance) is the AC equivalent of transresistance, and is the dual of transadmittance.

== Devices ==
=== Vacuum tubes ===
For vacuum tubes, transconductance is defined as the change in the plate (anode) current divided by the corresponding change in the grid/cathode voltage, with a constant plate (anode) to cathode voltage. Typical values of g_{m} for a small-signal vacuum tube are 1 to 10 mS. It is one of the three characteristic constants of a vacuum tube, the other two being its gain μ (mu) and plate resistance r_{p} or r_{a}. The Van der Bijl equation defines their relation as follows:

$g_\mathrm{m} = \frac{\mu}{r_\mathrm{p}}$

=== Field-effect transistors ===
Similarly, in field-effect transistors, and MOSFETs in particular, transconductance is the change in the drain current divided by the small change in the gate–source voltage with a constant drain–source voltage. Typical values of g_{m} for a small-signal field-effect transistor are 1 to 30 mS.

Using the Shichman–Hodges model, the transconductance for the MOSFET can be expressed as (see MOSFET § Modes of operation)

$$g_\text{m} = \frac{2I_\text{D}}{V_\text{OV}},$$

where I_{D} is the DC drain current at the bias point, and V_{OV} is the overdrive voltage, which is the difference between the bias point gate–source voltage and the threshold voltage (i.e., V_{OV} ≡ V_{GS} – V_{th}). The overdrive voltage (sometimes known as the effective voltage) is customarily chosen at about 70–200 mV for the 65 nm process node (I_{D} ≈ 1.13 mA/μm × width) for a g_{m} of 11–32 mS/μm.

Additionally, the transconductance for the junction FET is given by

$$g_\text{m} = \frac{2I_\text{DSS}}{|V_\text{P}|} \left(1 - \frac{V_\text{GS}}{V_\text{P}}\right),$$

where V_{P} is the pinchoff voltage, and I_{DSS} is the maximum drain current.

=== Bipolar transistors ===
The g_{m} of bipolar small-signal transistors varies widely, being proportional to the collector current. It has a typical range of 1 to 400 mS. The input voltage change is applied between the base/emitter and the output is the change in collector current flowing between the collector/emitter with a constant collector/emitter voltage.

The transconductance for the bipolar transistor can be expressed as

$$g_\mathrm{m} = \frac{I_\mathrm{C}}{V_\mathrm{T}}$$

where I_{C} is the DC collector current at the Q-point, and V_{T} is the thermal voltage, typically about 26 mV at room temperature. For a typical current of 10 mA, g_{m} ≈ 385 mS. The input impedance is the current gain (β) divided by the transconductance.

The output (collector) conductance is determined by the Early voltage and is proportional to the collector current. For most transistors in linear operation it is well below 100 μS.

== Amplifiers ==
=== Transconductance amplifiers ===
A transconductance amplifier (g_{m} amplifier) puts out a current proportional to its input voltage. In network analysis, the transconductance amplifier is defined as a voltage controlled current source (VCCS). These amplifiers are commonly seen installed in a cascode configuration, which improves the frequency response.

An ideal transconductance amplifier in a voltage follower configuration behaves at the output like a resistor of value 1/g_{m}, between a buffered copy of the input voltage and the output. If the follower is loaded by a single capacitor C, the voltage follower transfer function has a single pole with time constant C/g_{m}, or equivalently it behaves as a 1st-order low-pass filter with a −3 dB bandwidth of g_{m}/2πC.

==== Operational transconductance amplifiers ====
An operational transconductance amplifier (OTA) is an integrated circuit which can function as a transconductance amplifier. These normally have an input to allow the transconductance to be controlled.

=== Transresistance amplifiers ===
A transresistance amplifier outputs a voltage proportional to its input current. The transresistance amplifier is often referred to as a transimpedance amplifier, especially by semiconductor manufacturers.

The term for a transresistance amplifier in network analysis is current controlled voltage source (CCVS).

A basic inverting transresistance amplifier can be built from an operational amplifier and a single resistor. Simply connect the resistor between the output and the inverting input of the operational amplifier and connect the non-inverting input to ground. The output voltage will then be proportional to the input current at the inverting input, decreasing with increasing input current and vice versa.

Specialist chip transresistance (transimpedance) amplifiers are widely used for amplifying the signal current from photo diodes at the receiving end of ultra high speed fibre optic links.

== See also ==
- Transistor
- Vacuum tube
- Electronic amplifier
- Transimpedance amplifier
- Fontana bridge
- Operational transconductance amplifier
- MOSFET
