= Z-RAM =

Obsolete type of novel computer memory based on DRAM

Z-RAM is a tradename of a now-obsolete dynamic random-access memory technology that did not require a capacitor to maintain its state. Z-RAM was developed between 2002 and 2010 by a now-defunct company named Innovative Silicon.

Z-RAM relies on the floating body effect, an artifact of the silicon on insulator (SOI) process which places transistors in isolated tubs (the transistor body voltages "float" with respect to the wafer substrate beneath the tubs). The floating body effect causes a variable capacitance to appear between the bottom of the tub and the underlying substrate. The floating body effect is usually a parasitic effect that bedevils circuit designs, but also allows a DRAM-like cell to be built without adding a separate capacitor, the floating body effect then taking the place of the conventional capacitor. Because the capacitor is located under the transistor (instead of adjacent to, or above the transistor as in conventional DRAMs), another connotation of the name "Z-RAM" is that it extends in the negative z-direction.

Theoretically, a reduced cell size would have allowed denser storage, which in turn could (when used with large blocks) have improved access times by reducing the physical distance that data would have to travel to exit a block. For a large cache memory (as typically found in a high-performance microprocessor), Z-RAM would then have been potentially as fast as the SRAM used for conventional on-processor (L1/L2) caches, but with lower surface area (and thus cost). However, with advances in manufacturing techniques for conventional SRAM (most importantly, the transition to 32nm fabrication node), Z-RAM lost its size advantage.

Although AMD licensed the second generation Z-RAM in 2006, the processor manufacturer abandoned its Z-RAM plans in January 2010. Similarly, DRAM producer Hynix had also licensed Z-RAM for use in DRAM chips in 2007, and Innovative Silicon announced it was jointly developing a non-SOI version of Z-RAM that could be manufactured on lower cost bulk CMOS technology in March 2010, but Innovative Silicon closed on June 29, 2010. Its patent portfolio was acquired by Micron Technology in December 2010.
