= Operational transconductance amplifier =

Electrical circuit

Schematic symbol for an OTA with differential input. Like the standard operational amplifier, it has both inverting (−) and noninverting (+) inputs; power supply lines (V+ and V−); and a single output. Unlike the traditional op-amp, it has two additional biasing inputs, I_{abc} and I_{bias}.

The operational transconductance amplifier (OTA) is an amplifier that outputs a current proportional to its input voltage. Thus, it is a voltage controlled current source. Three types of OTAs are single-input single-output, differential-input single-output, and differential-input differential-output (a.k.a. fully differential), however this article focuses on differential-input single-output. There may be an additional input for a current to control the amplifier's transconductance.

The first commercially available integrated circuit units were produced by RCA in 1969 (before being acquired by General Electric) in the form of the CA3080. Although most units are constructed with bipolar transistors, field effect transistor units are also produced.

Like a standard operational amplifier, the OTA also has a high impedance differential input stage and may be used with negative feedback. But the OTA differs in that:

- The OTA outputs a current while a standard operational amplifier outputs a voltage.
- The OTA is usually used "open-loop"; without negative feedback in linear applications. This is possible because the magnitude of the resistance attached to its output controls its output voltage. Therefore, a resistance can be chosen that keeps the output from going into saturation, even with high differential input voltages.

These differences mean the vast majority of standard operational amplifier applications are not directly implementable with OTAs. However, OTAs can implement voltage-controlled filters, voltage-controlled oscillators (e.g. variable frequency oscillators), voltage-controlled resistors, and voltage-controlled variable gain amplifiers.

== Basic operation ==
In the ideal OTA, the output current is a linear function of the differential input voltage, calculated as follows:

$$I_\mathrm{out} = (V_\mathrm{in+} - V_\mathrm{in-}) \cdot g_\mathrm{m}$$

where V_{in+} is the voltage at the non-inverting input, V_{in−} is the voltage at the inverting input and g_{m} is the transconductance of the amplifier.

If the load is just a resistance of $R_\text{load}$ to ground, the OTA's output voltage is the product of its output current and its load resistance:

$$V_\mathrm{out} = I_\mathrm{out} \cdot R_\mathrm{load}$$

The voltage gain is then the output voltage divided by the differential input voltage:

$$G_\mathrm{voltage} = {V_\mathrm{out} \over V_\mathrm{in+} - V_\mathrm{in-}} = R_\mathrm{load} \cdot g_\mathrm{m}$$

The transconductance of the amplifier is usually controlled by an input current, denoted I_{abc} ("amplifier bias current"). The amplifier's transconductance is directly proportional to this current. This is the feature that makes it useful for electronic control of amplifier gain, etc.

== Non-ideal characteristics ==
As with the standard op-amp, practical OTA's have some non-ideal characteristics. These include:

- Input stage non-linearity at higher differential input voltages due to the characteristics of the input stage transistors. In the early devices, such as the CA3080, the input stage consisted of two bipolar transistors connected in the differential amplifier configuration. The transfer characteristics of this connection are approximately linear for differential input voltages of 20 mV or less. This is an important limitation when the OTA is being used open loop as there is no negative feedback to linearize the output. One scheme to improve this parameter is mentioned below.
- Temperature sensitivity of transconductance.
- Variation of input and output impedance, input bias current and input offset voltage with the transconductance control current I_{abc}.

== Subsequent improvements ==
Earlier versions of the OTA had neither the I_{bias} terminal (shown in the diagram) nor the diodes (shown adjacent to it). They were all added in later versions. As depicted in the diagram, the anodes of the diodes are attached together and the cathode of one is attached to the non inverting input (Vin+) and the cathode of the other to the inverting input (Vin−). The diodes are biased at the anodes by a current (I_{bias}) that is injected into the I_{bias} terminal. These additions make two substantial improvements to the OTA. First, when used with input resistors, the diodes distort the differential input voltage to offset a significant amount of input stage non linearity at higher differential input voltages. According to National Semiconductor, the addition of these diodes increases the linearity of the input stage by a factor of 4. That is, using the diodes, the signal distortion level at 80 mV of differential input is the same as that of the simple differential amplifier at a differential input of 20 mV. Second, the action of the biased diodes offsets much of the temperature sensitivity of the OTA's transconductance.

A second improvement is the integration of an optional-use output buffer amplifier to the chip on which the OTA resides. This is actually a convenience to a circuit designer rather than an improvement to the OTA itself; dispensing with the need to employ a separate buffer. It also allows the OTA to be used as a traditional op-amp, if desired, by converting its output current to a voltage.

An example of a chip combining both of these features is the National Semiconductor LM13600 and its successor, the LM13700.

== See also ==
- Current differencing transconductance amplifier
- Transimpedance amplifier – converts current to voltage
