= Relative directivity factor =

Formula for calculating signal to noise ratio

Relative directivity factor (RDF) is a figure of merit for radio receiving antennas. It is the antenna gain in the forward direction divided by the gain in all other directions. It is also called the signal to noise improvement factor (SNIF).
