= Subthreshold conduction =

Transistor current

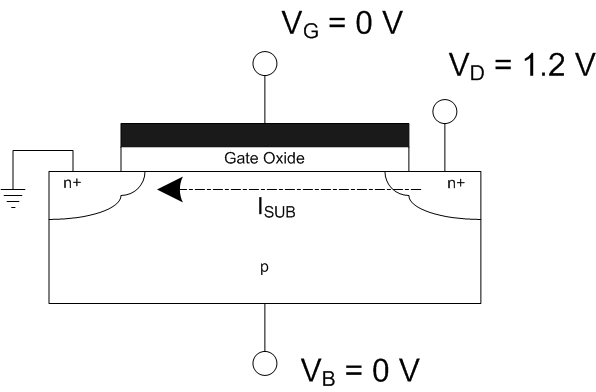
Subthreshold leakage in an nFET

Subthreshold conduction or subthreshold leakage or subthreshold drain current is the current between the source and drain of a MOSFET when the transistor is in subthreshold region, or weak-inversion region, that is, for gate-to-source voltages below the threshold voltage.

The amount of subthreshold conduction in a transistor is set by its threshold voltage, which is the minimum gate voltage required to switch the device between on and off states. However, as the drain current in a MOS device varies exponentially with gate voltage, the conduction does not immediately become zero when the threshold voltage is reached. Rather it continues showing an exponential behavior with respect to the subthreshold gate voltage. When plotted against the applied gate voltage, this subthreshold drain current exhibits a log-linear slope, which is defined as the subthreshold slope. Subthreshold slope is used as a figure of merit for the switching efficiency of a transistor.

In digital circuits, subthreshold conduction is generally viewed as a parasitic leakage in a state that would ideally have no conduction. In micropower analog circuits, on the other hand, weak inversion is an efficient operating region, and subthreshold is a useful transistor mode around which circuit functions are designed.

Historically, in CMOS circuits, the threshold voltage has been insignificant compared to the full range of gate voltage between the ground and supply voltages, which allowed for gate voltages significantly below the threshold in the off state. As gate voltages scaled down with transistor size, the room for gate voltage swing below the threshold voltage drastically reduced, and the subthreshold conduction became a significant part of the off-state leakage of a transistor. For a technology generation with threshold voltage of 0.2 V, subthreshold conduction, along with other leakage modes, can account for 50% of total power consumption.

== Sub-threshold electronics ==
Some devices exploit sub-threshold conduction to process data without fully turning on or off. Even in standard transistors a small amount of current leaks even when they are technically switched off. Some sub-threshold devices have been able to operate with between 1 and 0.1 percent of the power of standard chips.

Such lower power operations allow some devices to function with the small amounts of power that can be scavenged without an attached power supply, such as a wearable EKG monitor that can run entirely on body heat.

== See also ==
- Depletion and enhancement modes
- Integrated circuit
- Moore's law
- Multi-channel length
- Subthreshold slope
