= Threshold voltage =

Property of a field-effect transistor

A nanowire MOSFET's current–voltage characteristic (left, using logarithmic y-axis) and a simulation of the electron density (right) forming a conductive inversion channel which connects at the ~0.45 V threshold voltage. Extremely little current flows below this voltage.

The threshold voltage, commonly abbreviated as V_{th} or V_{GS(th)}, of a field-effect transistor (FET) is the minimum gate-to-source voltage (V_{GS}) that is needed to create a conducting path between the source and drain terminals. It is an important scaling factor to maintain power efficiency.

When referring to a junction field-effect transistor (JFET), the threshold voltage is often called pinch-off voltage instead. This is somewhat confusing since pinch off applied to insulated-gate field-effect transistor (IGFET) refers to the channel pinching that leads to current saturation behavior under high source–drain bias, even though the current is never off. Unlike pinch off, the term threshold voltage is unambiguous and refers to the same concept in any field-effect transistor.

== Basic principles ==
In n-channel enhancement-mode devices, a conductive channel does not exist naturally within the transistor. With no V_{GS}, dopant ions added to the body of the FET form a region with no mobile carriers called a depletion region. A positive V_{GS} attracts free-floating electrons within the body towards the gate. But enough electrons must be attracted near the gate to counter the dopant ions and form a conductive channel. This process is called inversion. The conductive channel connects from source to drain at the FET's threshold voltage. Even more electrons attract towards the gate at higher V_{GS}, which widens the channel.

The reverse is true for the p-channel "enhancement-mode" MOS transistor. When V_{GS} = 0 the device is “OFF” and the channel is open / non-conducting. The application of a negative gate voltage to the p-type "enhancement-mode" MOSFET enhances the channels conductivity turning it “ON”.

In contrast, n-channel depletion-mode devices have a conductive channel naturally existing within the transistor. Accordingly, the term threshold voltage does not readily apply to turning such devices on, but is used instead to denote the voltage level at which the channel is wide enough to allow electrons to flow easily. This ease-of-flow threshold also applies to p-channel depletion-mode devices, in which a negative voltage from gate to body/source creates a depletion layer by forcing the positively charged holes away from the gate-insulator/semiconductor interface, leaving exposed a carrier-free region of immobile, negatively charged acceptor ions.

For the n-channel depletion MOS transistor, a sufficient negative V_{GS} will deplete (hence its name) the conductive channel of its free electrons switching the transistor “OFF”. Likewise for a p-channel "depletion-mode" MOS transistor a sufficient positive gate-source voltage will deplete the channel of its free holes, turning it “OFF”.

In wide planar transistors the threshold voltage is essentially independent of the drain–source voltage (V_{DS}) and is therefore a well defined characteristic, however it is less clear in modern nanometer-sized MOSFETs due to drain-induced barrier lowering.

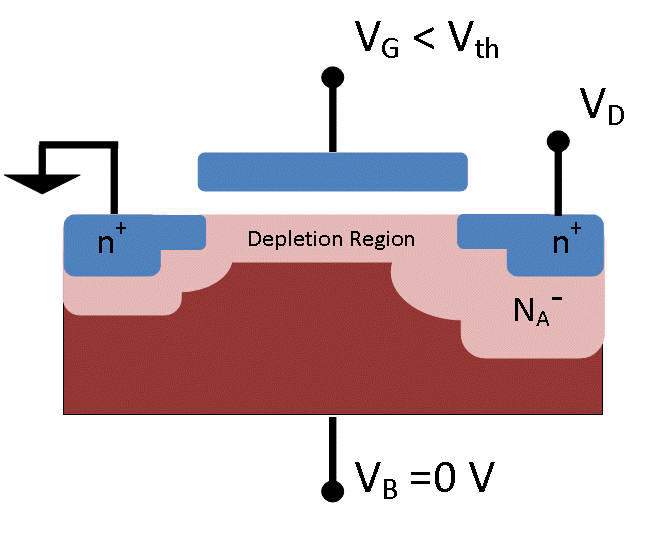
Depletion region of an enhancement-mode nMOSFET biased below the threshold

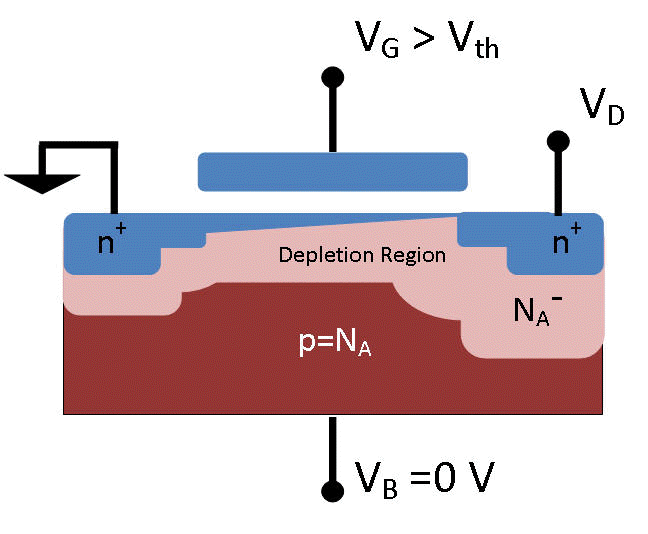
Depletion region of an enhancement-mode nMOSFET biased above the threshold with channel formed

In the figures, the source (left side) and drain (right side) are labeled n+ to indicate heavily doped (blue) n-regions. The depletion layer dopant is labeled N_{A}^{−} to indicate that the ions in the (pink) depletion layer are negatively charged and there are very few holes. In the (red) bulk the number of holes p = N_{A} making the bulk charge neutral.

If the gate voltage is below the threshold voltage (left figure), the "enhancement-mode" transistor is turned off and ideally there is no current from the drain to the source of the transistor. In fact, there is a current even for gate biases below the threshold (subthreshold leakage) current, although it is small and varies exponentially with gate bias. Therefore, datasheets will specify threshold voltage according to a specified measurable amount of current (commonly 250 μA or 1 mA).

If the gate voltage is above the threshold voltage (right figure), the "enhancement-mode" transistor is turned on, due to there being many electrons in the channel at the oxide-silicon interface, creating a low-resistance channel where charge can flow from drain to source. For voltages significantly above the threshold, this situation is called strong inversion. The channel is tapered when V_{D} > 0 because the voltage drop due to the current in the resistive channel reduces the oxide field supporting the channel as the drain is approached.

== Body effect ==
The body effect is the change in the threshold voltage by an amount approximately equal to the change in the source-bulk voltage, $V_{SB}$, because the body influences the threshold voltage (when it is not tied to the source). It can be thought of as a second gate, and is sometimes referred to as the back gate, and accordingly the body effect is sometimes called the back-gate effect.

For an enhancement-mode nMOS MOSFET, the body effect upon threshold voltage is computed according to the Shichman–Hodges model, which is accurate for older process nodes, using the following equation:

$$V_{TN} = V_{TO} + \gamma\left( \sqrt{\left| V_{SB} + 2\phi_F \right|} - \sqrt{\left| 2\phi_F \right|} \right)$$

where;

$V_{TN}$ is the threshold voltage when substrate bias is present,

$V_{SB}$ is the source-to-body substrate bias,

$2\phi_F$ is the surface potential,

$V_{TO}$ is threshold voltage for zero substrate bias,

$\gamma = \left(t_{ox}/\epsilon_{ox}\right)\sqrt{2q\epsilon_\text{Si} N_A}$ is the body effect parameter,

$t_{ox}$ is oxide thickness,

$\epsilon_{ox}$ is oxide permittivity,

$\epsilon_\text{Si}$ is the permittivity of silicon,

$N_A$ is a doping concentration,

$q$ is elementary charge.

== Dependence on oxide thickness ==
In a given technology node, such as the 90-nm CMOS process, the threshold voltage depends on the choice of oxide and on oxide thickness. Using the body formulas above, $V_{TN}$ is directly proportional to $\gamma$, and $t_{OX}$, which is the parameter for oxide thickness.

Thus, the thinner the oxide thickness, the lower the threshold voltage. Although this may seem to be an improvement, it is not without cost; because the thinner the oxide thickness, the higher the subthreshold leakage current through the device will be. Consequently, the design specification for 90-nm gate-oxide thickness was set at 1 nm to control the leakage current. This kind of tunneling, called Fowler-Nordheim Tunneling.

$$I_{fn} = C_1WL(E_{ox})^2e^{-\frac{E_0}{E_{ox}}}$$

where;

$C_1$ and $E_0$ are constants,

$E_{ox}$ is the electric field across the gate oxide.

Before scaling the design features down to 90 nm, a dual-oxide approach for creating the oxide thickness was a common solution to this issue. With a 90 nm process technology, a triple-oxide approach has been adopted in some cases. One standard thin oxide is used for most transistors, another for I/O driver cells, and a third for memory-and-pass transistor cells. These differences are based purely on the characteristics of oxide thickness on threshold voltage of CMOS technologies.

== Temperature dependence ==
As with the case of oxide thickness affecting threshold voltage, temperature has an effect on the threshold voltage of a CMOS device. Expanding on part of the equation in the body effect section

$$\phi_F = \left(\frac{kT}{q}\right) \ln{\left(\frac{N_A}{n_i}\right)}$$

where;

$\phi_F$ is half the contact potential,

$k$ is the Boltzmann constant,

$T$ is temperature,

$q$ is the elementary charge,

$N_A$ is a doping parameter,

$n_i$ is the intrinsic doping parameter for the substrate.

We see that the surface potential has a direct relationship with the temperature. Looking above, that the threshold voltage does not have a direct relationship but is not independent of the effects. This variation is typically between −4 mV/K and −2 mV/K depending on doping level. For a change of 30 °C this results in significant variation from the 500 mV design parameter commonly used for the 90-nm technology node.

== Dependence on random dopant fluctuation ==
Random dopant fluctuation (RDF) is a form of process variation resulting from variation in the implanted impurity concentration. In MOSFET transistors, RDF in the channel region can alter the transistor's properties, especially threshold voltage. In newer process technologies RDF has a larger effect because the total number of dopants is fewer.

Research works are being carried out in order to suppress the dopant fluctuation which leads to the variation of threshold voltage between devices undergoing same manufacturing process.

== See also ==
- MOSFET operation
- Channel length modulation
- Multi-threshold CMOS
