= Discrete complementary JFETS =

Transistor type

Discrete complementary JFETs are N-channel and P-channel JFETs that are built with a similar process technology and are designed to have similar or matching electrical characteristics. Discrete complementary JFETs come in separate P and N-channel packages. Dual discrete complementary JFETS house two N-channel JFETs in one monolithic unit and two P-channel units in another monolithic unit.

Because they are built on the same die, dual N-Channel JFETs have nearly equivalent or matched electrical characteristics. The same can be said for the dual P-Channel JFETs. Although, complementary P and N-Channels are built with the same process technology, because of basic differences between the construction of P and N channel devices, electrical specifications such as mobility and transconductance are slightly different for the P and N-Channel JFETs.

The complementary and matched nature of the dual N-channel and dual P-channel JFETs is fundamental to the building of many analog circuits, most notably amplifiers. Specifically, complementary amplifier topologies are based on a number of complementary matched JFET pairs. As one example, a fully complementary amplifier will use matched N and P-channel JFETs for the differential amplifier front end.

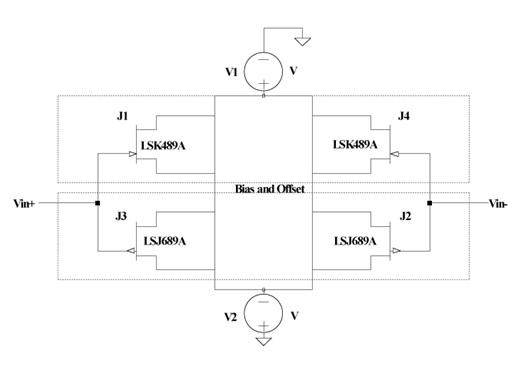
A dual complementary differential amplifier uses two complementary JFETs. This includes a matched N-Channel dual LSK489 JFET and a dual matched P-Channel LSJ689. JFET. The bias and offset network can be constructed from different arrangements of resistors and current sources.

Other complementary and matched JFET blocks within complementary amplifiers include stacked and folded cascode blocks and level translators (level shifters).

Source followers (buffers) are another complementary structure found in amplifiers. The complementary source follower, often used in the output stage of an amplifier, can be designed such that it can adjust the output offset voltage to zero, effectively, eliminating the need for an AC coupling capacitor.

A complementary source follower can also be paralleled to create power amplifiers. Nelson Pass built such a design based on Toshiba's 2SK170 and 2SJ74 single complementary JFETs with over 1000 parallel JFETs. Today though, since Toshiba discontinued these parts, you would have to build such an amplifier with LSK170 and LSJ74 single complementary pairs or with LSK489 and LSJ689 JFETs. Because the LSK489 and LSJ689 have lower input capacitance than Toshiba parts and are duals the same kind of amplifier design would have lower noise levels and a smaller footprint.

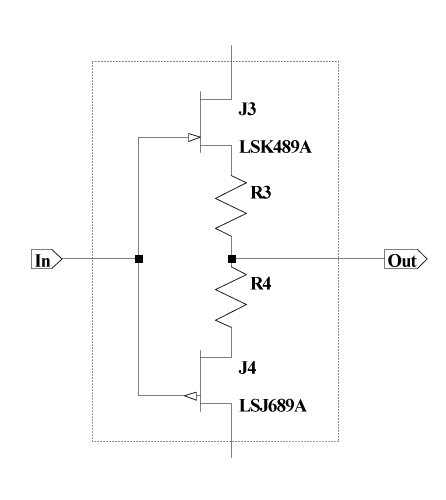
A complementary source follower can be built with complementary N-Channel and P-Channel JFETs. Paralleling source followers is one way to easily build a power amplifier.

Amplifier bias networks will also incorporate JFETs current sources, although not necessarily in matched arrangements. JFET current mirror designs, for use in amplifiers, have been patented using matched JFETs, such as the LSK389 and GaAs JFETs.

Besides amplifiers, discrete JFET matched pairs are also used in the design of voltage controlled resistors, voltage controlled current sources, current to voltage converters, programmable gain circuits, voltmeters, phasers and a wide range of analog computational circuits like absolute value circuits These blocks often are designed with matched N-channel pairs, matched P-channel pairs, or complementary matched pairs.

== Popularity ==
The long-term popularity of discrete complementary JFETs is a result of the ability of the designer to obtain better circuit performance at lower cost points than what can be obtained with more modern highly integrated devices. Well-known audio designers, like John Curl, Nelson Pass and Erno Borbely, also have proven to the marketplace, that discrete complementary JFETs are one of the better ways to achieve high-quality, low-noise audio designs.

Complementary JFET duals are also noted for their low equivalent noise voltage, high operating voltage, thermal tracking characteristics, low offset voltage, low pinch-off voltages, low input bias currents, and very high input impedance. All of these characteristics make these devices ideal for use in high performance audio, sensor and measurement applications.

== Future ==
Improved JFET process technologies, discrete JFET devices and JFET topologies will continue to challenge highly integrated monolithic designs for sockets in high quality electronic products. The primary reasons are cost and customization. Costs are too high for integrated circuit companies to integrate customized high-performance for niche markets. Costs performance trade-offs are met more easily with discrete devices.

Discrete designs based on hybrid topology breakthroughs will also continue to challenge highly integrated, highly commercialized monolithic designs in terms of performance and cost. Hybrid topologies that combine complementary JFET, complementary MOS, complementary bipolar transistor, complementary SiC JFET and complementary GaAs JFETs, are easier and more cost-effectively built from discrete components than integrate into highly advanced monolithic chips.
