= Bio-FET =

Type of field-effect transistor

A field-effect transistor-based biosensor, also known as a biosensor field-effect transistor (Bio-FET or BioFET), field-effect biosensor (FEB), or biosensor MOSFET, is a field-effect transistor (based on the MOSFET structure) that is gated by changes in the surface potential induced by the binding of molecules. When charged molecules, such as biomolecules, bind to the FET gate, which is usually a dielectric material, they can change the charge distribution of the underlying semiconductor material resulting in a change in conductance of the FET channel. A Bio-FET consists of two main compartments: one is the biological recognition element and the other is the field-effect transistor. The BioFET structure is largely based on the ion-sensitive field-effect transistor (ISFET), a type of metal–oxide–semiconductor field-effect transistor (MOSFET) where the metal gate is replaced by an ion-sensitive membrane, electrolyte solution, and reference electrode.

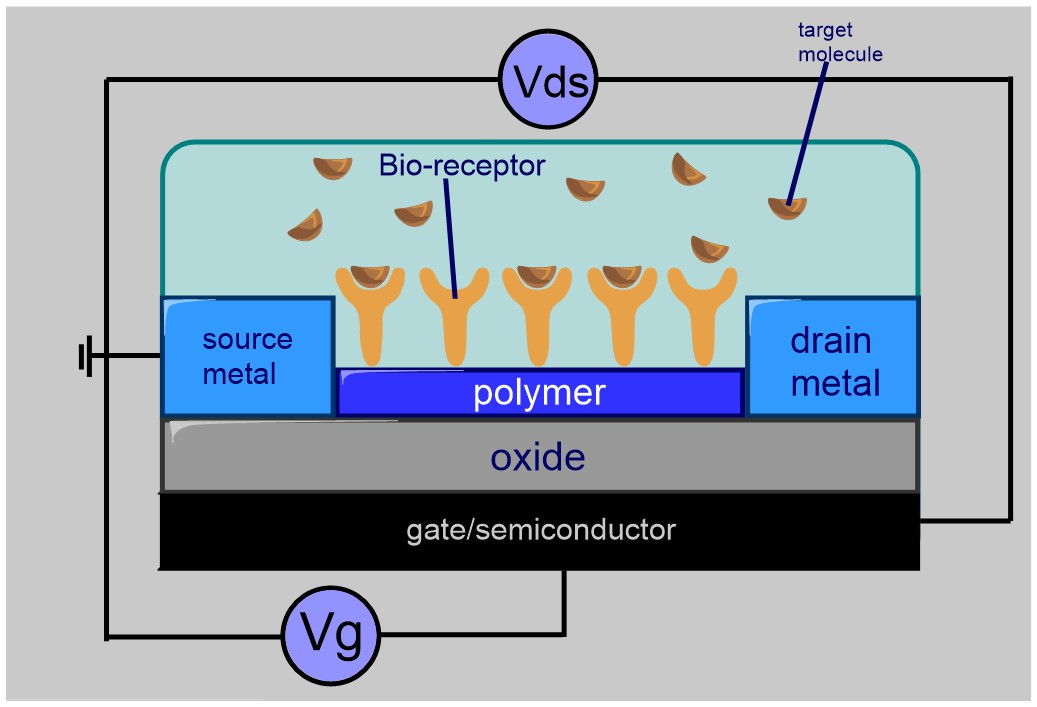
In a typical BioFET, an electrically and chemically insulating layer (e.g. Silica) separates the analyte solution from the semiconducting device. A polymer layer, most commonly APTES, is used to chemically link the surface to a receptor which is specific to the analyte (e.g. biotin or an antibody). Upon binding of the analyte, changes in the electrostatic potential at the surface of the electrolyte-insulator layer occur, which in turn results in an electrostatic gating effect of the semiconductor device, and a measurable change in current between the source and drain electrodes.

== Mechanism of operation ==
Bio-FETs couple a transistor device with a bio-sensitive layer that can specifically detect bio-molecules such as nucleic acids and proteins. A Bio-FET system consists of a semiconducting field-effect transistor that acts as a transducer separated by an insulator layer (e.g. SiO_{2}) from the biological recognition element (e.g. receptors or probe molecules) which are selective to the target molecule called analyte. Once the analyte binds to the recognition element, the charge distribution at the surface changes with a corresponding change in the electrostatic surface potential of the semiconductor. This change in the surface potential of the semiconductor acts like a gate voltage would in a traditional MOSFET, i.e. changing the amount of current that can flow between the source and drain electrodes. This change in current (or conductance) can be measured, thus the binding of the analyte can be detected. The precise relationship between the current and analyte concentration depends upon the region of transistor operation.

== Fabrication of Bio-FET ==
The fabrication of Bio-FET system consists of several steps as follows:

1. Finding a substrate suitable for serving as a FET site, and forming a FET on the substrate,
2. Exposing an active site of the FET from the substrate,
3. Providing a sensing film layer on active site of FET,
4. Providing a receptor on the sensing film layer in order to be used for ion detection,
5. Removing a semiconductor layer, and thinning a dielectric layer,
6. Etching the remaining portion of the dielectric layer to expose an active site of the FET,
7. Removing the photoresist, and depositing a sensing film layer followed by formation of a photoresist pattern on the sensing film,
8. Etching the unprotected portion of the sensing film layer, and removing the photoresist

== Advantages ==
The principle of operation of Bio-FET devices based on detecting changes in electrostatic potential due to binding of analyte. This the same mechanism of operation as glass electrode sensors which also detect changes in surface potential but were developed as early as the 1920s. Due to the small magnitude of the changes in surface potential upon binding of biomolecules or changing pH, glass electrodes require a high impedance amplifier which increases the size and cost of the device. In contrast, the advantage of Bio-FET devices is that they operate as an intrinsic amplifier, converting small changes in surface potential to large changes in current (through the transistor component) without the need for additional circuitry. This means BioFETs have the capability to be much smaller and more affordable than glass electrode-based biosensors. If the transistor is operated in the subthreshold region, then an exponential increase in current is expected for a unit change in surface potential.

Bio-FETs can be used for detection in fields such as medical diagnostics, biological research, environmental protection and food analysis. Conventional measurements like optical, spectrometric, electrochemical, and SPR measurements can also be used to analyze biological molecules. Nevertheless, these conventional methods are relatively time-consuming and expensive, involving multi-stage processes and also not compatible to real-time monitoring, in contrast to Bio-FETs. Bio-FETs are low weight, low cost of mass production, small size and compatible with commercial planar processes for large-scale circuitry. They can be easily integrated into digital microfluidic devices for Lab-on-a-chip. For example, a microfluidic device can control sample droplet transport whilst enabling detection of bio-molecules, signal processing, and the data transmission, using an all-in-one chip. Bio-FET also does not require any labeling step, and simply utilise a specific molecular (e.g. antibody, ssDNA) on the sensor surface to provide selectivity. Some Bio-FETs display fascinating electronic and optical properties. An example FET would is a glucose-sensitive based on the modification of the gate surface of ISFET with SiO_{2} nanoparticles and the enzyme glucose oxidase (GOD); this device showed obviously enhanced sensitivity and extended lifetime compared with that without SiO_{2} nanoparticles.

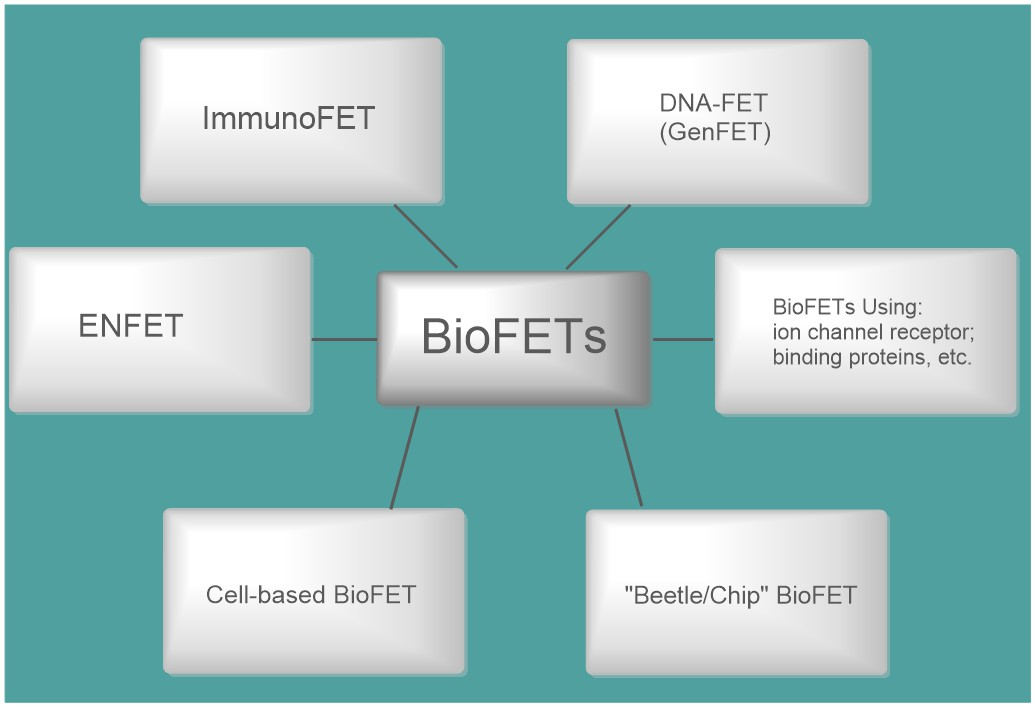
Bio-FETs are classified based on the bio recognition element used for detection: En-FET which is an enzyme-modified FET, Immuno-FET which is an immunologically modified FET, DNA-FET which is a DNA-modified FET, CPFET which is cell-potential FET, beetle/chip FET and artificial BioFET-based.

== Optimization ==
The choice of reference electrode (liquid gate) or back-gate voltage determines the carrier concentration within the field effect transistor, and therefore its region of operation, therefore the response of the device can be optimised by tuning the gate voltage. If the transistor is operated in the subthreshold region then an exponential increase in current is expected for a unit change in surface potential. The response is often reported as the change in current on analyte binding divided by the initial current ($\Delta I/I_{0}$), and this value is always maximal in the subthreshold region of operation due to this exponential amplification. For most devices, optimum signal-to-noise, defined as change in current divided by the baseline noise, ($\Delta I/\delta i_\text{noise}$) is also obtained when operating in the subthreshold region, however as the noise sources vary between devices, this is device dependent.

One optimization of Bio-FET may be to put a hydrophobic passivation surface on the source and the drain to reduce non-specific biomolecular binding to regions which are not the sensing-surface. Many other optimisation strategies have been reviewed in the literature.

== History ==
The MOSFET was invented at Bell Labs between 1959 and 1960. In 1962, Leland C. Clark and Champ Lyons invented the first biosensor. Biosensor MOSFETs (BioFETs) were later developed, and they have since been widely used to measure physical, chemical, biological and environmental parameters.

The first BioFET was the ion-sensitive field-effect transistor (ISFET), invented by Piet Bergveld for electrochemical and biological applications in 1970. Other early BioFETs include the adsorption FET (ADFET) patented by P.F. Cox in 1974, and a hydrogen-sensitive MOSFET demonstrated by I. Lundstrom, M.S. Shivaraman, C.S. Svenson and L. Lundkvist in 1975. The ISFET is a special type of MOSFET with a gate at a certain distance, and where the metal gate is replaced by an ion-sensitive membrane, electrolyte solution and reference electrode. The ISFET is widely used in biomedical applications, such as the detection of DNA hybridization, biomarker detection from blood, antibody detection, glucose measurement, pH sensing, and genetic technology.

By the mid-1980s, other BioFETs had been developed, including the gas sensor FET (GASFET), pressure sensor FET (PRESSFET), chemical field-effect transistor (ChemFET), reference ISFET (REFET), enzyme-modified FET (ENFET) and immunologically modified FET (IMFET). By the early 2000s, BioFETs such as the DNA field-effect transistor (DNAFET), gene-modified FET (GenFET), and cell-potential BioFET (CPFET) had been developed. Current research in this area has produced new formations of the BioFET such as the Organic Electrolyte Gated FET (OEGFET).

== See also ==
- ChemFET: chemically sensitive field-effect transistor
- ISFET: ion-sensitive field-effect transistor
