= PTE technique =

The Photothermoelectric (PTE) effect is based on the Seebeck effect, where the heating is achieved by absorbing light on a thermoelectric (TE) material. Synonymous to PPE technique for thermal characterization of materials, PTE can be used to thermally characterize both thermoelectrics (acts as sensor and sample) and other sample materials (while acting as a sensor). An advantage of such sensors stems from their wide temperature range of applicability since pyromaterials are limited to its curie temperature. On the other hand, in order to obtain a useful signal from TE material, depends on its Seebeck coefficient, comparatively large amount of heat (light excitation) has to be deposited on the material. As far as now, Frequency domain PTE technique is in its preliminary stage for the thermal characterization of materials. Advances were done in liquid thermoelectrics as well on PTE.
