= ISFET =

Type of field-effect transistor

An ion-sensitive field-effect transistor (ISFET) is a field-effect transistor used for measuring ion concentrations in solution; when the ion concentration (such as H^{+}, see pH scale) changes, the current through the transistor will change accordingly. Here, the solution is used as the gate electrode. A voltage between substrate and oxide surfaces arises due to an ion sheath. It is a special type of MOSFET (metal–oxide–semiconductor field-effect transistor), and shares the same basic structure, but with the metal gate replaced by an ion-sensitive membrane, electrolyte solution and reference electrode. Invented in 1970, the ISFET was the first biosensor FET (BioFET).

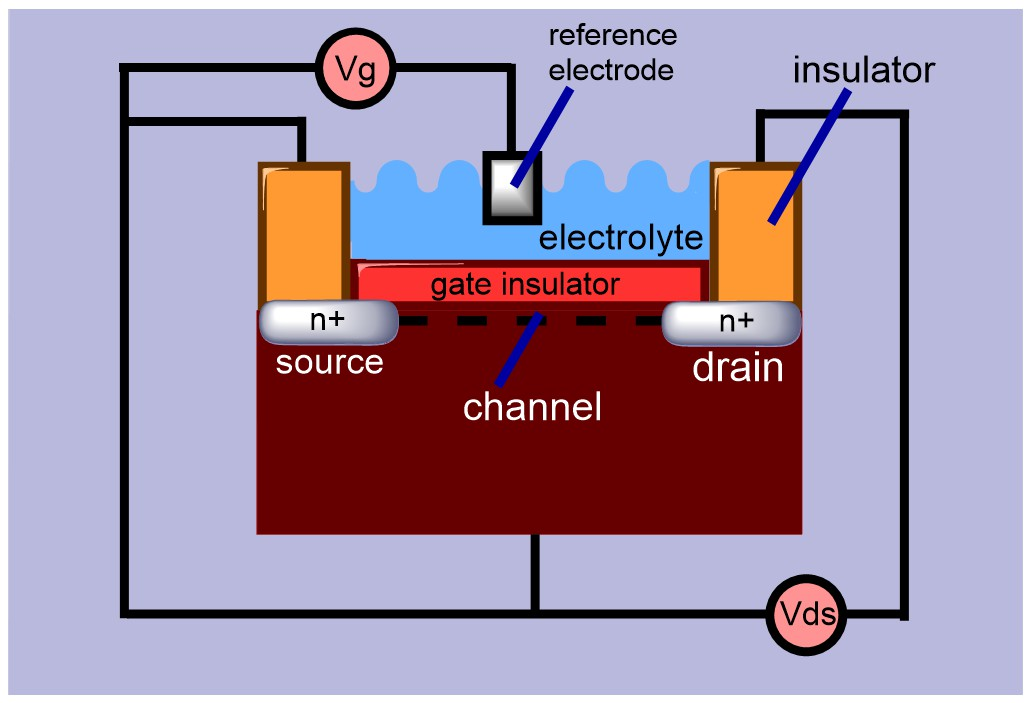
The schematic view of an ISFET. Source and drain are the two electrodes used in a FET system. The electron flow takes place in a channel between the drain and source. The gate potential controls the flow of current between the two electrodes.

The surface hydrolysis of Si–OH groups of the gate materials varies in aqueous solutions due to pH value. Typical gate materials are SiO_{2}, Si_{3}N_{4}, Al_{2}O_{3} and Ta_{2}O_{5}.

The mechanism responsible for the oxide surface charge can be described by the site binding model, which describes the equilibrium between the Si–OH surface sites and the H^{+} ions in the solution. The hydroxyl groups coating an oxide surface such as that of SiO_{2} can donate or accept a proton and thus behave in an amphoteric way as illustrated by the following acid-base reactions occurring at the oxide-electrolyte interface:

—Si–OH + H_{2}O ↔ —Si–O^{−} + H_{3}O^{+}

—Si–OH + H_{3}O^{+} ↔ —Si–OH_{2}^{+} + H_{2}O

An ISFET's source and drain are constructed as for a MOSFET. The gate electrode is separated from the channel by a barrier which is sensitive to hydrogen ions and a gap to allow the substance under test to come in contact with the sensitive barrier. An ISFET's threshold voltage depends on the pH of the substance in contact with its ion-sensitive barrier.

== Practical limitations due to the reference electrode ==
An ISFET electrode sensitive to H^{+} concentration can be used as a conventional glass electrode to measure the pH of a solution. However, it also requires a reference electrode to operate. If the reference electrode used in contact with the solution is of the AgCl or Hg_{2}Cl_{2} classical type, it will suffer the same limitations as conventional pH electrodes (junction potential, KCl leak, and glycerol leak in case of gel electrode). A conventional reference electrode can also be bulky and fragile. A too large volume constrained by a classical reference electrode also precludes the miniaturization of the ISFET electrode, a mandatory feature for some biological or in vivo clinical analyses (disposable mini-catheter pH probe). The breakdown of a conventional reference electrode could also make problem in on-line measurements in the pharmaceutical or food industry if highly valuable products are contaminated by electrode debris or toxic chemical compounds at a late production stage and must be discarded for the sake of safety.

For this reason, since more than 20 years many research efforts have been dedicated to on-chip embedded tiny reference field effect transistors (REFET). Their functioning principle, or operating mode, can vary, depending on the electrode producers and are often proprietary and protected by patents. Semi-conductor modified surfaces required for REFET are also not always in thermodynamical equilibrium with the test solution and can be sensitive to aggressive or interfering dissolved species or not well characterized aging phenomena. This is not a real problem if the electrode can be frequently re-calibrated at regular time interval and is easily maintained during its service life. However, this may be an issue if the electrode has to remain immersed on-line for prolonged period of time, or is inaccessible for particular constrains related to the nature of the measurements itself (geochemical measurements under elevated water pressure in harsh environments or under anoxic or reducing conditions easily disturbed by atmospheric oxygen ingress or pressure changes).

A crucial factor for ISFET electrodes, as for conventional glass electrodes, remains thus the reference electrode. When troubleshooting electrode malfunctions, often, most of the problems have to be searched for from the side of the reference electrode.

== Low-frequency noise of ISFET ==
For ISFET-based sensors, low-frequency noise is most detrimental to the overall SNR as it can interfere with biomedical signals which span in the same frequency domain. The noise has mainly three sources. The noise sources outside the ISFET itself are referred to as the external noise, such as environmental interference and instrument noise from terminal read-out circuits. The intrinsic noise refers to that appearing in the solid part of an ISFET, which is mainly caused by the trapping and de-trapping of carriers at the Oxide/Si interface. And the extrinsic noise is generally rooted in the liquid/oxide interface causing by the ion exchange at the liquid/oxide interface. Many methods are invented to suppress the noise of ISFET. For example, to suppress the external noise, we can integrate a bipolar junction transistor with ISFET to realize immediate the internal amplification of drain current. And to suppress the intrinsic noise we can replace the noisy oxide/Si interface by a Schottky junction gate.

== Drift of ISFET ==
Drift of ISFET refers to the threshold voltage instability. When the intrinsic response of the pH-ISFET is completed, the output voltage of the ISFET still vary with time gradually and monotonically, and this drift behavior exists during the entire measurement process. It has been one of the serious obstacles in developing commercially viable, ISFET-based biomedical sensors. In particular, the high accuracy desired for continuous monitoring of blood pH imposes stringent requirements on the tolerable drift rate in pH ISFETs.

Proposed explanations for drift include electric field enhanced ion migration within the gate insulator as well as electrochemical nonequilibrium conditions at the insulator solution interface, injection of electrons from the electrolyte at strong anodic polarizations, creating negative space charge inside the insulator films, and slow surface effects.

== History ==
The basis for the ISFET is the MOSFET. Dutch engineer Piet Bergveld, at the University of Twente studied the MOSFET and realized it could be adapted into a sensor for electrochemical and biological applications. This led to Bergveld's invention of the ISFET in 1970. He described the ISFET as "a special type of MOSFET with a gate at a certain distance". It was the earliest biosensor FET (BioFET).

ISFET sensors could be implemented in integrated circuits based on CMOS (complementary MOS) technology. ISFET devices are widely used in biomedical applications, such as the detection of DNA hybridization, biomarker detection from blood, antibody detection, glucose measurement and pH sensing. The ISFET is also the basis for later BioFETs, such as the DNA field-effect transistor (DNAFET), used in genetic technology.

Recently, Graphene field effect transistors (GFETs) operating in liquids have emerged as a promising embodiments of ISFETs. This is because graphene channels offer a more sensitive charge-to-current transducer compared to conventional devices based on classical semiconducting channels. Additionally, the graphene surface is more convenient to functionalize compared to silicon, leading to a wide range of developments in bioFETs.

== See also ==
- Chemical field-effect transistor
- Ion-selective electrodes
- MISFET: metal–insulator–semiconductor field-effect transistor
- MOSFET: metal–oxide–semiconductor field-effect transistor
- pH
- pH meter
- Potentiometry
- Quinhydrone electrode
- Saturated calomel electrode
- Silver chloride electrode
- Standard hydrogen electrode

== Bibliography ==
- Bergveld, P. (2003). "Thirty years of ISFETOLOGY, What happened in the past 30 years and what may happen in the next 30 years". Sensors and Actuators B: Chemical. 88 (1): 1–20. Bibcode:2003SeAcB..88....1B. doi:10.1016/S0925-4005(02)00301-5.
- Bergveld, P. (2003). ISFET, theory and practice (PDF). IEEE Sensor Conference, October 2003. Toronto: IEEE. p. 26.
- ISFET pH Sensors
