= Regenerative loop antenna =

Type of antenna

The regenerative loop antenna can consist of a tuned signal winding on an open X frame with a feed back winding in close proximity. High effective gain is achieved, for example by placing this feedback winding in the drain circuit of a JFET (junction field effect transistor). An antenna of this type employing vacuum tubes was constructed by Vladimir Zworykin in the 1920s.

== Sources ==
- ARRL publication QEX, January/February 2007, pages 45–46.
