= Fetron =

The Fetron was a range of solid-state, plug-compatible replacements for vacuum tubes (valves).

Fetrons were manufactured by Teledyne Semiconductor from 1967; primarily as a low-maintenance and low-power swap-in to replace vacuum tubes, which were becoming increasingly obsolete and difficult to source with the widespread use of solid-state electronics. They were used in large numbers in telephone exchanges. Vacuum tubes use significant amounts of power to maintain operating temperature, and large installations had substantial air-conditioning requirements; replacing them with fetrons was expected to reduce cooling and maintenance costs.

A typical fetron consisted of a cascode configured pair of JFETs, some simple RC networks to control the device characteristics, and a fuse. The device was mounted in a metal tube with a base that has the same pin-out as the vacuum tube that it replaced.

== Use ==
Fetrons were used to upgrade oscilloscopes and similar test equipment. They were used in specialist audio amplifiers such as the Mesa Boogie Mark Series.

Fetrons occasionally appear on eBay and similar, and are collected by vintage radio enthusiasts.

== Other manufacturers ==
Western Electric produced the conceptually similar Hybrid Integrated Network devices, which were used in their own telephone equipment.
