= Photopyroelectric =

Photopyroelectric As known that Photopyroelectric can be regarded as –Photo +Pyroelectric，which means any optical systems using a pyroelectric detector or imaging system, In addition, pyroelectricity could be depicted as the capability of the components formulating the transient voltage when heated or cooled. Once the temperature on which they depend changes, the position of the atom will change slightly in the crystal structure. This process of change can also be referred to as the polarization of the material. As a result, the voltage across the crystal will be triggered by this change in polarization. To further explain, when the temperature in the engine is kept constant for a period of time, the voltage in the photovoltage will gradually disappear due to the leakage current. In this sense, leakage is mainly caused by several ways, for example, electrons going through the crystal, ions going through the air, or current leaking through a voltmeter connected to the crystal.

== Technical Base of Photopyroelectric ==
The photopyroelectric refers to the technique of the optimal system which is mainly based on the imaginary system and the pyroelectric detector.

=== Pyroelectric detector ===
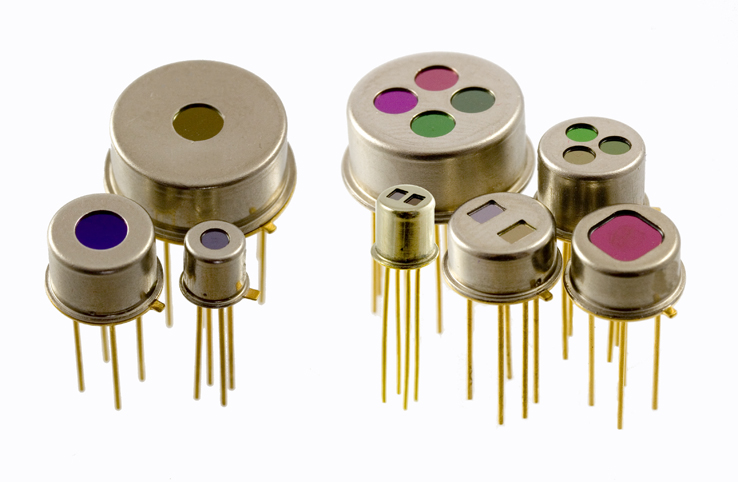

In terms of the pyroelectric detector, it can be used as a sensor to support the system. Due to the unipolar axis characteristics of the pyroelectric crystal, it is characterized by asymmetry. Polarization due to changes in temperature, the so-called pyroelectric effect, is currently widely used in sensor technology. Pyroelectric crystals need to be very thin to prepare and are plated in a direction perpendicular to the polar axis. An absorbing layer (blackening layer) is also required on the upper electrode. When this absorbing layer is exposed to infrared radiation, the pyroelectric chip is heated and produces a surface electrode. If the amount of radiation is interrupted, a charge opposite to the direction of polarization is generated. However, this charge is very small, so the charge is converted to a signal voltage by ultra low noise and ultra low leakage field effect transistors (JFET) or operational amplifiers (OpAmp) before neutralized by the internal resistance of the crystal. Pyroelectric detectors have a high signal-to-noise ratio even at 4K Hz. For example, in a Fourier infrared spectrometer, a thermopile can only perform better at a few hertz.

=== Imaginary system ===
In terms of the imaginary system, it is a general term for various types of remote sensor systems that acquire remote sensing images of objects without photography. Scanning is usually used for imaging, tape recording or indirect recording on film. According to the structure of the system, the scanning method and the detector parts are roughly divided into: 1. Optomechanical scanning. Such as multi-spectral scanners. The mirror is used to scan the object surface, and the image data is output after being split, detected and photoelectrically converted. 2. Electronic scanning. For example, a return beam guiding TV camera, is an image-side scanning method. The process is optical imaging on the target surface of the light guide, and the signal is amplified and output after being scanned by the electron beam. 3. Robust self-scanning. For example, the photoelectric scanning sensor of the French SPOT satellite is also an image scanning method. The object is imaged by an objective lens on a detector array consisting of a plurality of charge coupled devices (CCDs) that are photoelectrically converted and output. 4. Antenna scanning. Such as side-view radar, which is an active remote sensing imaging system that is a surface scanning method. It transmits the microwave beam through the antenna and receives an echo reflected by the scene, which is demodulated and output.

== The Use of Photopyroelectric ==
=== Photopyroelectric calorimetry of composite materials ===
The use of optoelectronics tells us that previous optoelectronic structures were used to check the thermal efficiency of certain materials that were composite and inserted into the detection unit as a liner. This technique depends on the coupled fluid thickness scanning process (TWRC method). Two special composites were chosen for this study: (I) Liquid: Nanofluid based on water and containing gold nanoparticles (ii) More solid type: Urea - Fumaric acid eutectic in a ratio of 1:1. It has been found that the thermal effusivity is independent upon the volume and concentration in the gold particles. Considering the eutectic characterized by urea-fumaric acid, it can be reasonably concluded that the value of the heat permeable compound is quite different from that of the pure raw material. This illustrates the production of compounds.

Self-consistence photopyroelectric calorimetry for liquids This photopyroelectric also demonstrate that the front photopyroelectric (FPPE)structure is also important. In addition, it clearly explains the Thermal Wave Resonator Cavity (TWRC) method, which is designed to check the thermal mobility and diffusivity of liquids. It has demonstrated that the same type of technology is capable of producing a variety of static and dynamic thermal parameters. In addition, two of these parameters are checked and calculated in a straightforward manner, while the other two are still calculated indirectly. This method shows the principle of sustainability in that it studies certain liquids such as various oils, water, glycerin, ethylene glycol and the like.

== Photopyroelectric Effect and Pyroelectric Measurement ==
Due to fluid processing, photoelectric effect and thermoelectric measurement and subtraction between the sample and the detector, the optoelectronic technology used in the standard distribution systematically underestimates the thermal diffusivity of the solid sample. In order to solve the negative effects in the process of treating fluids in this study, a completely new method will be proposed. It depends on the application of the transparent thermoelectric sensor as well as the transparent coupling of the fluid, as well as the self-standardization process. In this sense, it is easy to measure examples of accurate opacity and solidity of thermal diffusivity, as well as the light absorption coefficient of translucent solid samples.

== Photopyroelectric for the Simultaneous Thermal ==
Photoelectron display thermophysical studies for simultaneous thermals are very important and critical in many relevant academic sciences. The heating capacity is closely related to the microstructure of the approved material and is important in monitoring the energy content of the system. Therefore, calorimetry plays an important role in the cataloging of physical systems, especially in the transition phase where energy fluctuations are very important. This paper summarizes the ability of photothermographic technology to study the variation of certain heat and other thermal parameters with temperature and is closely related to the transition. The working principle is applied to the theoretical basis, and the experimental structure and additional benefits of the technology compared with the traditional technology are described in detail. The integration in the calorimetric setting provides the possibility of performing calorimetric studies while also depicting the complementary nature of optical, structural and electrical properties. This paper reviews the high temperature resolution results for several phase transition parameters in different systems under various possible configurations.

== Optimized configuration of the pyroelectric sensor in photopyroelectric technique ==
Optimized configuration of pyroelectric sensors in optoelectronic technology. It has been shown that in the case of constant laser power, the response of the pyroelectric sensor would not depend on the spatial distribution of the intensity of the laser beam. Therefore, depending on the voltage model, the signal amplitude will be inversely proportional to the effective range of the sensor. In addition, the thermoelectric signal may increase once the effective area decreases and the total area of the sensor remains constant. Based on this, by optimizing the metal electrode structure of the sensor, a method is proposed to improve the PPE signal measured in voltage mode. The experiment shows that this improved method can increase the signal amplitude by 10 times without increasing the electrical noise.

== Deficiency in the photopyroelectric ==
Types of deficiency

The so-called optical component surface defects mainly refer to surface rickets and surface contaminants. Surface rickets refer to various processing defects such as pitting, scratches, open bubbles, broken edges, and broken spots on the surface of polished optical components. The main reason is processing or subsequent processing. Scratches are the scratches on the surface of an optical component. Due to the length of the scratch, it can be divided into long scratches and short scratches, with a limit of 2 mm. If the scratch length is greater than 2 mm, it is a long scratch, and if it is less than 2 mm, it is a short scratch . For short scratches, the evaluation criterion is to detect their cumulative length. Relatively speaking, scratches are easier to detect than defects such as pitting.

Pitting refers to pits and defects on the surface of an optical component. The surface roughness in the pit is large, the width and depth are approximately the same, and the edges are irregular. Typically, defects with an aspect ratio greater than 4:1 are scratches, while defects less than 4:1 are pitting.

The bubbles are formed by gases that are not removed in time during the manufacture or processing of the optical component. Since the pressure of the gas in each direction is evenly distributed, the shape of the bubble is usually spherical.

Broken edges are a criticism of the edge of optical components. Although it is outside the effective area of the light source, it is also a source of light scattering, which also has an effect on optical performance.

Negative impact caused by the deficiency

Surface rickets, as a microscopic local defect caused by man-made process, have a certain influence on the surface properties of optical components, which may lead to serious consequences such as optical instrument operation errors. In short, the surface defects of optical components can be detrimental to the performance of optical systems, and the root cause is the scattering characteristics of light. The damage of optical component surface defects to itself and the entire optical system is manifested in the following aspects:

(1) The quality of the beam is degraded. The surface scattering defect of the component produces a scattering effect of light, so that the energy of the beam is greatly consumed after passing through the defect, thereby reducing the quality of the beam.

(2) The thermal effect of defects. Since the area where the surface defects are located absorbs more energy than other areas, the thermal effect phenomenon may cause local particial deformation of the component, damage the film layer, etc., and thus damage the entire optical system.

(3) Damage to other optical components in the system. In a laser system, under the illumination of a high-energy laser beam, the scattered light generated by the surface of the component is absorbed by other optical components in the system, resulting in uneven light received by the component. When the damage threshold of the optical component material is reached. The quality of the transmitted light is affected, and the optical components are damaged, which is more likely to cause serious damage to the optical system.

(4) Rickets can affect the cleanliness of the field of view. When there are too many rickets on the optical components, it will affect the microscopic aesthetics. In addition, the cockroaches will leave tiny dust, microorganisms, polishing powder and other impurities, which will cause the components to be corroded, moldy, and foggy. Will significantly affect the basic performance of the component.
