= Chemical field-effect transistor =

Type of field-effect transistor

A ChemFET is a chemically-sensitive field-effect transistor, that is a field-effect transistor used as a sensor for measuring chemical concentrations in solution. When the target analyte concentration changes, the current through the transistor will change accordingly. Here, the analyte solution separates the source and gate electrodes. A concentration gradient between the solution and the gate electrode arises due to a semi-permeable membrane on the FET surface containing receptor moieties that preferentially bind the target analyte. This concentration gradient of charged analyte ions creates a chemical potential between the source and gate, which is in turn measured by the FET.

== Construction ==
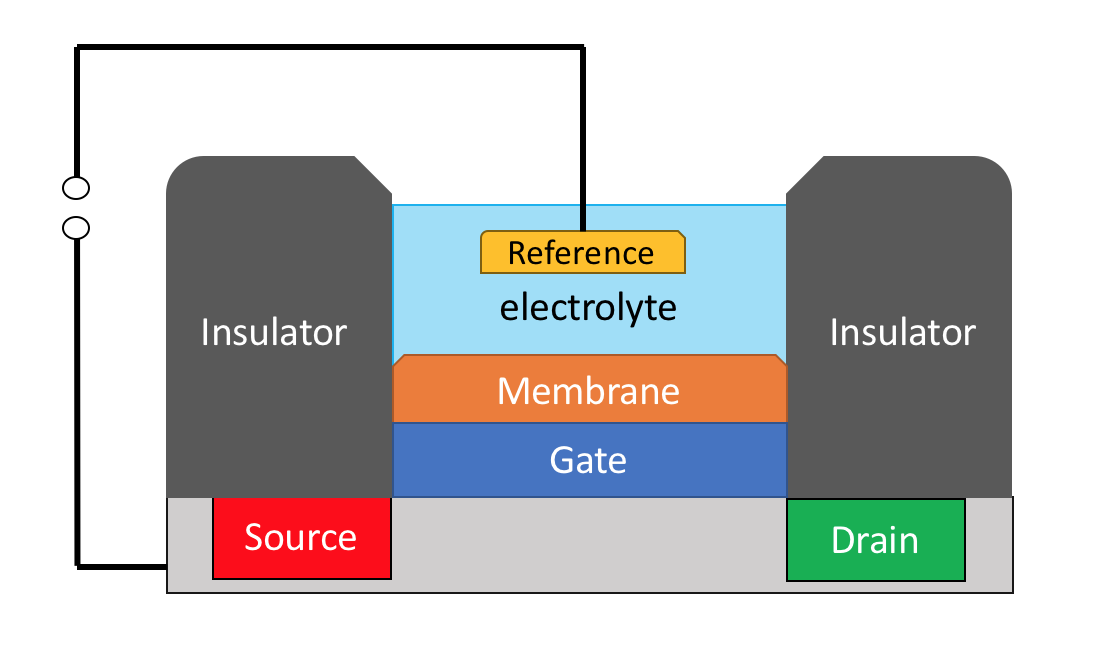
The schematic view of a ChemFET. Source, drain, and gate are the three electrodes used in a FET system. The electron flow takes place in a channel between the drain and source. The gate potential controls the current between the source and drain electrodes.

A ChemFET's source and drain are constructed as for an ISFET, with the gate electrode separated from the source electrode by a solution. The gate electrode's interface with the solution is a semi-permeable membrane containing the receptors, and a gap to allow the substance under test to come in contact with the sensitive receptor moieties. A ChemFET's threshold voltage depends on the concentration gradient between the analyte in solution and the analyte in contact with its receptor-embedded semi-permeable barrier.

Often, ionophores are used to facilitate analyte ion mobility through the substrate to the receptor. For example, when targeting anions, quaternary ammonium salts (such as tetraoctylammonium bromide) are used to provide cationic nature to the membrane, facilitating anion mobility through the substrate to the receptor moieties.

== Applications ==
ChemFETs can be utilized in either liquid or gas phase to detect target analyte, requiring reversible binding of analyte with a receptor located in the gate electrode membrane. There is a wide range of applications of ChemFETs, including most notably anion or cation selective sensing. More work has been done with cation-sensing ChemFETs than anion-sensing ChemFETs. Anion-sensing is more complicated than cation-sensing in ChemFETs due to many factors, including the size, shape, geometry, polarity, and pH of the species of interest.

== Practical limitations ==
The body of a ChemFET is generally found to be robust. However, the unavoidable requirement for a separate reference electrode makes the system more bulky overall and potentially more fragile.

== History ==
Dutch engineer Piet Bergveld studied the MOSFET and realized it could be adapted into a sensor for chemical and biological applications.

In 1970, Bergveld invented the ion-sensitive field-effect transistor (ISFET). He described the ISFET as "a special type of MOSFET with a gate at a certain distance". In the ISFET structure, the metal gate of a standard MOSFET is replaced by an ion-sensitive membrane, electrolyte solution and reference electrode.

ChemFETs are based on a modified ISFET, a concept developed by Bergveld in the 1970s. There is some confusion as to the relationship between ChemFETs and ISFETs. Whereas an ISFET only detects ions, a ChemFET detects any chemical (including ions).

== See also ==
- Chemiresistor – Material with changing electrical resistance according to its surroundings
- EOSFET – Type of field-effect transistor
- Electronic nose – Electronic sensor for odor detection
