= George Clement Dacey =

American scientist

- Born: 1921; Illinois, U.S.
- Died: November 27, 2010; United States
- Occupation: Scientist

George Clement Dacey (1921–2010) was an American scientist and inventor who played a key role in the history of the transistor.

== Biography ==
He was born in 1921 in Illinois, United States. He was the son of Helen and Clement Dacey. He died in 2010 in the United States.

== Education ==
He completed his Bachelor of Science degree from the University of Illinois in 1942.

He earned a PhD in physics from the California Institute of Technology, in 1951.

== Career ==
He worked at the Westinghouse Research Laboratories during World War II.

He worked at Bell Labs, and was named assistant director in 1958 and was director of solid-state electronics research in 1960–1961). He is the holder of nine patents.

In 1981, he became the president of the Sandia Corporation.

In 1973 Dacey was elected to the National Academy of Engineering.

== Publications ==
- Dacey, George Clement (1951). Design and Calibration of a New Apparatus to Measure the Specific Electronic Charge (PhD thesis). California Institute of Technology. doi:10.7907/KW0Z-FQ64.
