= DNA field-effect transistor =

A DNA field-effect transistor (DNAFET) is a field-effect transistor which uses the field-effect due to the partial charges of DNA molecules to function as a biosensor. The structure of DNAFETs is similar to that of MOSFETs, with the exception of the gate structure which, in DNAFETs, is replaced by a layer of immobilized ssDNA (single-stranded DNA) molecules which act as surface receptors. When complementary DNA strands hybridize to the receptors, the charge distribution near the surface changes, which in turn modulates current transport through the semiconductor transducer.

Arrays of DNAFETs can be used for detecting single nucleotide polymorphisms (causing many hereditary diseases) and for DNA sequencing. Their main advantage compared to optical detection methods in common use today is that they do not require labeling of molecules. Furthermore, they work continuously and (near) real-time. DNAFETs are highly selective since only specific binding modulates charge transport.
