= Degenerate semiconductor =

Semiconductor so highly doped it acts like a metal

A degenerate semiconductor is a semiconductor with such a high level of doping that the material starts to act more like a metal than a semiconductor. Unlike non-degenerate semiconductors, these kinds of semiconductor do not obey the law of mass action, which relates intrinsic carrier concentration with temperature and bandgap.

At moderate doping levels, the dopant atoms create individual doping levels that can often be considered as localized states that can donate electrons or holes by thermal promotion (or an optical transition) to the conduction or valence bands respectively. At high enough impurity concentrations, the individual impurity atoms may become close enough neighbors that their doping levels merge into an impurity band and the behavior of such a system ceases to show the typical traits of a semiconductor, e.g. its increase in conductivity with temperature. On the other hand, a degenerate semiconductor still has far fewer charge carriers than a true metal so that its behavior is in many ways intermediary between semiconductor and metal.

Many copper chalcogenides are degenerate p-type semiconductors with relatively large numbers of holes in their valence band. An example is the system LaCuOS_{1−x}Se_{x} with Mg doping. It is a wide gap p-type degenerate semiconductor. The hole concentration does not change with temperature, a typical trait of degenerate semiconductors.

Another well known example is indium tin oxide. Because its plasma frequency is in the IR-range, it is a fairly good metallic conductor, but transparent in the visible range of the spectrum.
