= Homojunction =

A homojunction PN junction. The band at the interface is continuous. In forward bias mode, the depletion width decreases. Both p and n junctions are doped at a 1e15/cm3 doping level, leading to built-in potential of ~0.59 V. Observe the different Quasi Fermi levels for conduction band and valence band in n and p regions (red curves).

A homojunction is a semiconductor interface that occurs between layers of similar semiconductor material; these materials have equal band gaps but typically have different doping. In most practical cases a homojunction occurs at the interface between an n-type (donor doped) and p-type (acceptor doped) semiconductor such as silicon, this is called a p–n junction.

This is not a necessary condition as the only requirement is that the same semiconductor (same band gap) is found on both sides of the junction, in contrast to a heterojunction. An n-type to n-type junction, for example, would be considered a homojunction even if the doping levels are different.

The different doping level will cause band bending, and a depletion region will be formed at the interface, as shown in the figure to the right.

== See also ==
- Transistor
- p–n junction
- Band bending
- Doping (semiconductor)
