= Mass action law (electronics) =

Equation in solid-state physics

In electronics and semiconductor physics, the law of mass action relates the concentrations of free electrons and electron holes under thermal equilibrium. It states that, under thermal equilibrium, the product of the free electron concentration $n$ and the free hole concentration $p$ is equal to a constant square of intrinsic carrier concentration $n_\text{i}$. The intrinsic carrier concentration is a function of temperature.

The equation for the mass action law for semiconductors is: $np = n_\text{i}^{2}$

== Carrier concentrations ==
In semiconductors, free electrons and holes are the carriers that provide conduction. For cases where the number of carriers are much less than the number of band states, the carrier concentrations can be approximated by using Boltzmann statistics, giving the results below.

=== Electron concentration ===
The free-electron concentration n can be approximated by $n = N_\text{c} \exp\left[-\frac{E_\text{c} - E_\text{F}}{k_\text{B} T}\right],$ where

- E_{c} is the energy of the conduction band,
- E_{F} is the energy of the Fermi level,
- k_{B} is the Boltzmann constant,
- T is the absolute temperature in kelvins,
- N_{c} is the effective density of states at the conduction band edge given by $N_\text{c} = 2\left(\frac{2\pi m_\text{e}^* k_\text{B} T}{h^2}\right)^{3/2}$, with m*_{e} being the electron effective mass and h being the Planck constant.

=== Hole concentration ===
The free-hole concentration p is given by a similar formula $p = N_\text{v} \exp\left[-\frac{E_\text{F} - E_\text{v}}{k_\text{B} T}\right],$ where

- E_{F} is the energy of the Fermi level,
- E_{v} is the energy of the valence band,
- k_{B} is the Boltzmann constant,
- T is the absolute temperature in kelvins,
- N_{v} is the effective density of states at the valence band edge given by $N_\text{v} = 2\left(\frac{2\pi m_\text{h}^* k_\text{B} T}{h^2}\right)^{3/2}$, with m*_{h} being the hole effective mass and h being the Planck constant.

=== Mass action law ===
Using the carrier concentration equations given above, the mass action law can be stated as $np = N_\text{c} N_\text{v} \exp\left(-\frac{E_\text{g}}{k_\text{B} T}\right) = n_i^2,$ where E_{g} is the band gap energy given by E_{g} = E_{c} − E_{v}. The above equation holds true even for lightly doped extrinsic semiconductors as the product $np$ is independent of doping concentration.

== See also ==
- Law of mass action
