= Deathnium =

Coined term used to describe a trap in semiconductors

Deathnium is a name given by early electronic engineers to a trap in semiconductors that reduces the lifetime of both electron and hole charge carriers. It is considered the fifth of the imperfections that must be considered in semiconductor crystals to understand semiconductor effects along with holes, electrons, donors, and acceptors. Deathnium hastens the establishment of equilibrium between holes and electrons. This condition was not anticipated but it emerged during the invention of bipolar junction transistor after the influence of deep-trap impurities introduced by contamination of the manufacturing machinery, which reduced the lifetime of semiconductors.

Research in the early 1950s eventually revealed that "deathnium" was usually copper.
