= Anode =

Electrode through which conventional current flows into a polarized electrical device

Diagram of a zinc anode in a galvanic cell. Note how electrons move out of the cell, and the conventional current moves into it in the opposite direction.

An anode usually is an electrode of a polarized electrical device through which conventional current enters the device. This contrasts with a cathode, which is usually an electrode of the device through which conventional current leaves the device. A common mnemonic is ACID, for Anode Current Into Device. The direction of conventional current (the flow of positive charges) in a circuit is opposite to the direction of electron flow, so (negatively charged) electrons flow from the anode of a galvanic cell, into an outside or external circuit connected to the cell. For example, the end of a household battery marked with a + is the cathode (while discharging).

In both a galvanic cell and an electrolytic cell, the anode is the electrode at which the oxidation reaction occurs. In a galvanic cell, the anode is the wire or plate having excess negative charge as a result of the oxidation reaction. In an electrolytic cell, the anode is the wire or plate upon which excess positive charge is imposed. As a result of this, anions will tend to move towards the anode, where they will undergo oxidation.

Historically, the anode of a galvanic cell was also known as the zincode because it was usually composed of zinc.

== Charge flow ==
The terms anode and cathode are not defined by the voltage polarity of electrodes, but are usually defined by the direction of current through the electrode. An anode usually is the electrode of a device through which conventional current (positive charge) flows into the device from an external circuit, while a cathode usually is the electrode through which conventional current flows out of the device.

In general, if the current through the electrodes reverses direction, as occurs, for example, in a rechargeable battery when it is being charged, the roles of the electrodes as anode and cathode are reversed. However, the definition of anode and cathode is different for electrical devices such as diodes and vacuum tubes where the electrode naming is fixed and does not depend on the actual charge flow (current). These devices usually allow substantial current flow in one direction but negligible current in the other direction. Therefore, the electrodes are named based on the direction of this forward current. In a diode, the anode is the terminal through which current enters and the cathode is the terminal through which current leaves, when the diode is forward biased. The names of the electrodes do not change in cases where reverse current flows through the device. Similarly, in a vacuum tube, only one electrode can thermionically emit electrons into the evacuated tube, so electrons can only enter the device from the external circuit through the heated electrode. Therefore, this electrode is permanently named the cathode, and the electrode through which the electrons exit the tube is named the anode.

Conventional current depends not only on the direction the charge carriers move, but also the carriers' electric charge. The currents outside the device are usually carried by electrons in a metal conductor. Since electrons have a negative charge, the direction of electron flow is opposite to the direction of conventional current. Consequently, electrons leave the device through the anode and enter the device through the cathode.

== Examples ==
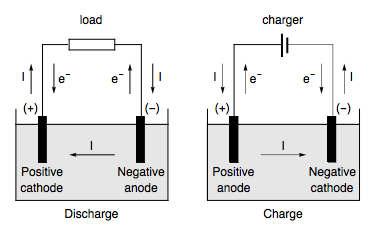
Electric current and electrons directions for a secondary battery during discharge and charge

The polarity of voltage on an anode with respect to an associated cathode varies depending on the device type and on its operating mode. In the following examples, the anode is negative in a device that provides power, and positive in a device that consumes power:

In a discharging battery or galvanic cell (diagram on left), the anode is the negative terminal: it is where conventional current flows into the cell. This inward current is carried externally by electrons moving outwards.

In a recharging battery, or an electrolytic cell, the anode is the positive terminal imposed by an external source of potential difference. The current through a recharging battery is opposite to the direction of current during discharge; in other words, the electrode that was the cathode during battery discharge becomes the anode while the battery is recharging.

In battery engineering, it is common to designate one electrode of a rechargeable battery the anode and the other the cathode according to the roles the electrodes play when the battery is discharged. This is despite the fact that the roles are reversed when the battery is charged. When this is done, anode simply designates the negative terminal of the battery and cathode designates the positive terminal.

In a diode, the anode is the terminal represented by the tail of the arrow symbol (flat side of the triangle), where conventional current flows into the device. Note the electrode naming for diodes is always based on the direction of the forward current (that of the arrow, in which the current flows most easily), even for types such as Zener diodes where the current of interest is the reverse current.

In vacuum tubes or gas-filled tubes, the anode is the terminal where current enters the tube.

== Etymology ==
The word was coined in 1834 from the Greek ἄνοδος (anodos), 'ascent', by William Whewell, who had been consulted by Michael Faraday over some new names needed to complete a paper on the recently discovered process of electrolysis. In that paper Faraday explained that when an electrolytic cell is oriented so that electric current traverses the "decomposing body" (electrolyte) in a direction "from East to West, or, which will strengthen this help to the memory, that in which the sun appears to move", the anode is where the current enters the electrolyte, on the East side: "ano upwards, odos a way; the way which the sun rises".

The use of East to mean the in direction (actually in → East → sunrise → up) may appear contrived. Previously, as related in the first reference cited above, Faraday had used the more straightforward term eisode (the doorway where the current enters). His motivation for changing it to something meaning the East electrode (other candidates had been eastode, oriode and anatolode) was to make it immune to a possible later change in the direction convention for current, whose exact nature was not known at the time. The reference he used to this effect was the Earth's magnetic field direction, which at that time was believed to be invariant. He fundamentally defined his arbitrary orientation for the cell as being that in which the internal current would run parallel to and in the same direction as a hypothetical magnetizing current loop around the local line of latitude, which would induce a magnetic dipole field oriented like the Earth's. This made the internal current East to West as previously mentioned, but in the event of a later convention change, it would have become West to East, so that the East electrode would not have been the way in anymore. Therefore, eisode would have become inappropriate, whereas anode meaning East electrode would have remained correct with respect to the unchanged direction of the actual phenomenon underlying the current, then unknown but, he thought, unambiguously defined by the magnetic reference. In retrospect the name change was unfortunate, not only because the Greek roots alone do not reveal the anode's function any more, but more importantly because as we now know, the Earth's magnetic field direction on which the anode term is based is subject to reversals whereas the current direction convention on which the eisode term was based has no reason to change in the future.

Since the later discovery of the electron, an easier to remember and more durably correct technically although historically false, etymology has been suggested: anode, from the Greek anodos, way up, the way (up) out of the cell (or other device) for electrons.

== Electrolytic anode ==
In electrochemistry, the anode is where oxidation occurs and is the positive polarity contact in an electrolytic cell. At the anode, anions (negative ions) are forced by the electrical potential to react chemically and give off electrons (oxidation) which then flow up and into the driving circuit. Mnemonics: LEO Red Cat (Loss of Electrons is Oxidation, Reduction occurs at the Cathode), or AnOx Red Cat (Anode Oxidation, Reduction Cathode), or OIL RIG (Oxidation is Loss, Reduction is Gain of electrons), or Roman Catholic and Orthodox (Reduction – Cathode, anode – Oxidation), or LEO the lion says GER (Losing electrons is Oxidation, Gaining electrons is Reduction).

This process is widely used in metal refining. For example, in copper refining, copper anodes, an intermediate product from the furnaces, are electrolysed in an appropriate solution (such as sulfuric acid) to yield high-purity (99.99%) cathodes. Copper cathodes produced using this method are also described as electrolytic copper.

Historically, when non-reactive anodes were desired for electrolysis, graphite (called plumbago in Faraday's time) or platinum were chosen. They were found to be some of the least reactive materials for anodes. Platinum erodes very slowly compared to other materials, and graphite crumbles and can produce carbon dioxide in aqueous solutions but otherwise does not participate in the reaction.

== Battery or galvanic cell anode ==
Galvanic cell

In a battery or galvanic cell, the anode is the negative electrode from which electrons flow out towards the external part of the circuit. Internally the positively charged cations are flowing away from the anode (even though it is negative and therefore would be expected to attract them, this is due to electrode potential relative to the electrolyte solution being different for the anode and cathode metal/electrolyte systems); but, external to the cell in the circuit, electrons are being pushed out through the negative contact and thus through the circuit by the voltage potential as would be expected.

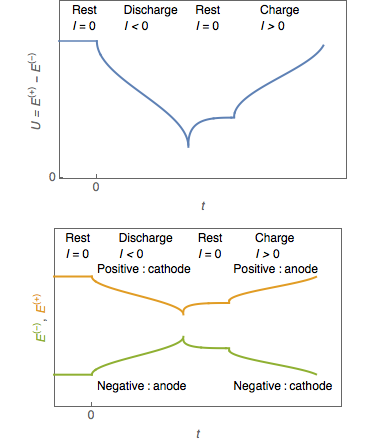
Positive and negative electrode vs. anode and cathode for a secondary battery

Battery manufacturers may regard the negative electrode as the anode, particularly in their technical literature. Though from an electrochemical viewpoint incorrect, it does resolve the problem of which electrode is the anode in a secondary (or rechargeable) cell. Using the traditional definition, the anode switches ends between charge and discharge cycles.

== Vacuum tube anode ==
Cutaway diagram of a triode vacuum tube, showing the plate (anode)

In electronic vacuum devices such as a cathode ray tube, the anode is the positively charged electron collector. In a tube, the anode is a charged positive plate that collects the electrons emitted by the cathode through electric attraction. It also accelerates the flow of these electrons.

== Diode anode ==

In a semiconductor diode, the anode is the P-doped layer, which initially supplies holes to the junction. In the junction region, the holes supplied by the anode combine with electrons supplied from the N-doped region, creating a depleted zone. As the P-doped layer supplies holes to the depleted region, negative dopant ions are left behind in the P-doped layer ('P' for positive charge-carrier ions). This creates a base negative charge on the anode. When a positive voltage is applied to the anode of the diode from the circuit, more holes are able to be transferred to the depleted region, and this causes the diode to become conductive, allowing current to flow through the circuit. The terms anode and cathode should not be applied to a Zener diode, since it allows flow in either direction, depending on the polarity of the applied potential (i.e., voltage).

== Sacrificial anode ==
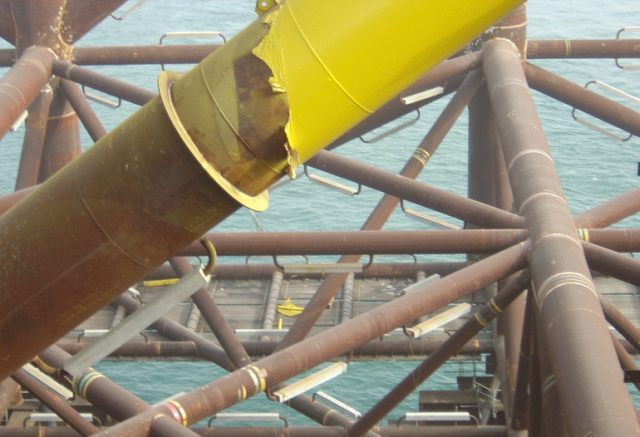
Sacrificial anodes mounted on the fly for corrosion protection of a metal structure

In cathodic protection, a metal anode that is more reactive to the corrosive environment than the metal system to be protected is electrically linked to the protected system. As a result, the metal anode partially corrodes or dissolves instead of the metal system. As an example, an iron or steel ship's hull may be protected by a zinc sacrificial anode, which will dissolve into the seawater and prevent the hull from being corroded. Sacrificial anodes are particularly needed for systems where a static charge is generated by the action of flowing liquids, such as pipelines and watercraft. Sacrificial anodes are also generally used in tank-type water heaters.

In 1824, to reduce the impact of this destructive electrolytic action on ships' hulls, their fastenings and underwater equipment, the scientist-engineer Humphry Davy developed the first and still most widely used marine electrolysis protection system. Davy installed sacrificial anodes made from a more electrically reactive (less noble) metal attached to the vessel hull and electrically connected to form a cathodic protection circuit.

A less obvious example of this type of protection is the process of galvanising iron. This process coats iron structures (such as fencing) with a coating of zinc metal. As long as the zinc remains intact, the iron is protected from the effects of corrosion. Inevitably, the zinc coating becomes breached, either by cracking or physical damage. Once this occurs, corrosive elements act as an electrolyte and the zinc/iron combination as electrodes. The resultant current ensures that the zinc coating is sacrificed but that the base iron does not corrode. Such a coating can protect an iron structure for a few decades, but once the protective coating is consumed, the iron rapidly corrodes.

If, conversely, tin is used to coat steel, when a breach of the coating occurs, it actually accelerates oxidation of the iron.

== Impressed current anode ==
Another cathodic protection is used on the impressed current anode. It is made from titanium and covered with mixed metal oxide. Unlike the sacrificial anode rod, the impressed current anode does not sacrifice its structure. This technology uses an external current provided by a DC source to create the cathodic protection. Impressed current anodes are used in larger structures like pipelines, boats, city water tower, water heaters and more.

== Related antonym ==
The opposite of an anode is a cathode. When the current through the device is reversed, the electrodes switch functions, so the anode becomes the cathode and the cathode becomes the anode, as long as the reversed current is applied. The exception is diodes, where electrode naming is always based on the forward current direction.

== See also ==
- Anodizing
- Galvanic anode
- Gas-filled tube
- Primary cell
- Redox (reduction–oxidation)
