= Tribovoltaic effect =

Current from a sliding pn junction

The tribovoltaic effect is a type of triboelectric current where a direct-current (DC) current is generated by sliding a P-type semiconductor on top of a N-type semiconductor or a metal surface without the illumination of photons, which was firstly proposed by Wang et al. in 2019 and later observed experimentally in 2020. When a P-type semiconductor slides over a N-type semiconductor, electron-hole pairs can be produced at the interface, which separate in the built-in electric field (contact potential difference) at the semiconductor interface, generating a DC current. Research has shown that the tribovoltaic effect can occur at various interfaces, such as metal-semiconductor interface, P-N semiconductors interface, metal-insulator-semiconductor interface, metal-insulator-metal interface, and liquid-semiconductor interface. The tribovoltaic effect may find applications in the fields of energy harvesting and smart sensing.

== Nomenclature ==
It has been suggested that the generation of tribo-current at the sliding PN junction or Schottky junction is analogous to the generation of photo-current in the photovoltaic effect, and the only difference is that the energy for exciting the electron-hole pairs is different, so it was named "tribovoltaic effect" by Wang et al.

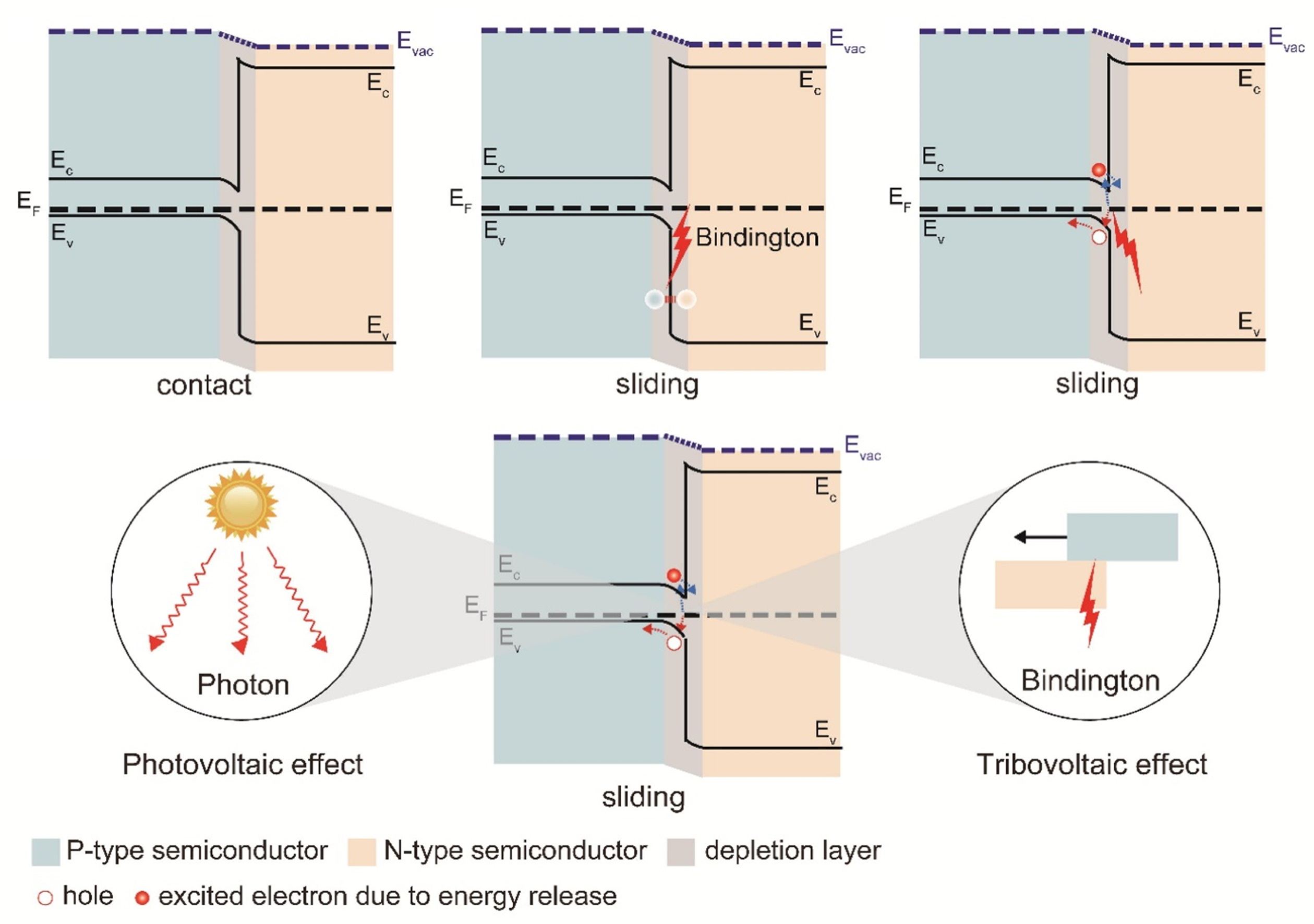
Energy band diagram of the tribovoltaic effect

== Experimental evidence ==
The tribovoltaic effect was observed at both macro- and nano-scale. It was found that a direct current can be generated by sliding the N-type diamond coated tip over the P-type Si samples, and the direction of the tribo-current depends on the direction of the built-in electric field at the PN and Schottky junctions.

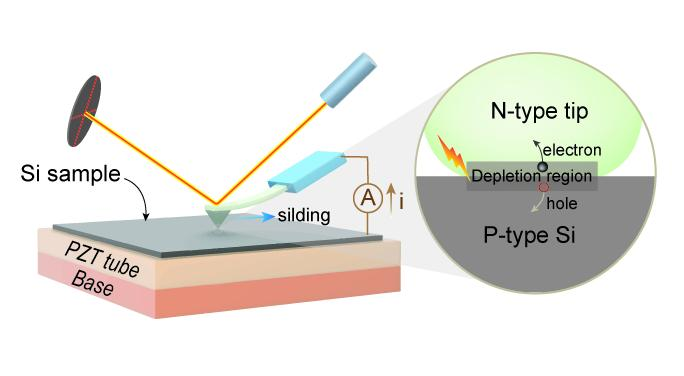
Tribovoltaic experiment

== Tribovoltaic effect at different interfaces ==
Metal-semiconductor interface. When a Pt-coated silicon atomic force microscopy (AFM) tip rubs on molybdenum disulfide (MoS_{2}) surface, a DC current with a maximum density of 10^{6} A/m^{2} is generated. Similarly using a pure Pt tip to rub both p-type and N-type silicon samples, the current follows the contact potential.

P-N semiconductors interface. When using a N-type silicon to rub with a P-type Si, a DC current from the P-type Si to the N-type silicon is produced, with the same direction as the built-in electric field at the PN junction. Furthermore, when a N-type diamond-coated silicon tip is used to rub with the surfaces of N-type silicon and P-type Si, tribocurrent can be generated at the interfaces of N-type tip and P-type Si.

Metal-insulator-semiconductor interface. When a conducting tip rubs with a silicon, the tribovoltaic effect can induce water molecules to form an oxide layer on the silicon surface, and the tribo-current decreases gradually with increasing the thickness of oxide layer.

Metal-insulator-metal interface. The studies of DC output characteristics of Al-TiO_{2}-Ti heterojunctions show that the open-circuit voltage increases with increasing the thickness of TiO_{2}, while the short-circuit current first increases and then decreases. The experiments have revealed that the tribo-current is contributed by quantum tunneling, thermionic emission and trap-assisted transport.

Liquid-semiconductor interface. The tribovoltaic effect can also occur at aqueous solution and solid semiconductor interface, in which the aqueous solution is considered as a liquid semiconductor. The tribovoltaic effect at liquid-solid interface was also observed by Wang et al.
