= Acceptor =

Acceptor may refer to:

- Acceptor (accounting), the addressee of a bill of exchange
- In the Indian Contract Act of 1872, the acceptor is the person to whom a proposal is made, and who has communicated his or her acceptance of the said proposal
- Electron acceptor, in chemistry an atom or compound to which electrons are donated during the formation of a coordinate covalent bond
- Acceptor (semiconductors)
- Acceptor (finite-state machine), in sequential logic a type of finite-state machine
- Medieval English term for a hawk, from the Latin accipiter meaning any of several species of hawks, probably from acu-peter, "swift-flying"
