= Inversion layer =

Inversion layer may refer to one of the following:

- Inversion (meteorology), a layer within which an atmospheric property is inverted, i.e., its change is deviated from the normal pattern
- Inversion layer (semiconductors), a layer in a semiconductor material where the type of the majority carriers changes to its opposite under certain conditions
