= Sensistor =

Example of electronic circuit with the sensistor Rs

Sensistor is a resistor whose resistance changes with temperature.

The resistance increases exponentially with temperature, that is the temperature coefficient is positive (e.g. 0.7% per degree Celsius).

Sensistors are used in electronic circuits for compensation of temperature influence or as sensors of temperature for other circuits.

Sensistors are made by using very heavily doped semiconductors so that their operation is similar to PTC-type thermistors. However, very heavily doped semiconductor behaves more like a metal and the resistance change is more gradual than it is the case for other PTC thermistors.

== See also ==
- thermistor
