= Dopant activation =

Dopant activation is the process of obtaining the desired electronic contribution from impurity species in a semiconductor host. The term is often restricted to the application of thermal energy following the ion implantation of dopants. In the most common industrial example, rapid thermal processing is applied to silicon following the ion implantation of dopants such as phosphorus, arsenic and boron. Vacancies generated at elevated temperature (1200 °C) facilitate the movement of these species from interstitial to substitutional lattice sites while amorphization damage from the implantation process recrystallizes. A relatively rapid process, peak temperature is often maintained for less than one second to minimize unwanted chemical diffusion.
