= List of chemistry mnemonics =

A mnemonic is a memory aid used to improve long-term memory and make the process of consolidation easier. Many chemistry aspects, rules, names of compounds, sequences of elements, their reactivity, etc., can be easily and efficiently memorized with the help of mnemonics. This article contains a list of certain mnemonics in chemistry.

== Orbitals ==
=== Sequence of orbitals ===
s p d f g h i k

- Sober Physicists Don't Find Giraffes Hiding In Kitchens.

Note: After the k shell, they follow alphabetical order (skipping s and p as they came earlier).

=== Aufbau principle ===
1s^{2} 2s^{2} 2p^{6} 3s^{2} 3p^{6} 4s^{2} 3d^{10} ...

The order of sequence of atomic orbitals (according to Madelung rule or Klechkowski rule) can be remembered by the following.

Order in which orbitals are arranged by increasing energy according to the Madelung rule. Each diagonal red arrow corresponds to a different value of n + l.

== Periodic table ==
=== Periods ===
==== Periods 1, 2 and 3 ====
H He Li Be B C N O F Ne Na (Sodium) Mg Al Si P S Cl Ar

- Hi Hello Little Beer Bottles Crack Nicely On Freddie's kNee. Nasties Merge All Silly 'People Suffer Clouts Arnti.
- Happy Henry Likes Beans Brownies and Chocolate Nuts Over Friday's News. Naughty Margaret Always Sighs, "Please Stop Clowning Around." Kind Cats Scare Tiny Vicious Creatures, Might Fear Cows & Nice Cute Zebras.
- Happy Henry Likes Beans Brownies and Chocolate Nuts Over Friday's News.
- Happy Harry/Henry Listens B B C Network Over France Nevertheless Nothing More Arose So Peter Stopped Cleaning Airgun K Ca.
- Ha. Healthy Little Beggar Boys Catching Newts Or Fish.
- Hi, Here Little Beatniks Brandish Countless Number Of Flick kNives. Nagging Maggie Always Sighs, "Please Stop Clowning Around." (adapted)
- Hi Helium. Little Berries Borrow Carbs, NO Fight Needed.
- Hi Hello! Lion Beneath the Burning Car Needs Oxygen For New life.
- Native Magpies Always Sit Peacefully Searching Clear Areas.
- Naval Magistrates Always Signal Per Siren, Claiming Adequacy.
- Naughty Margaret Always Sighs, "Please Stop Clowning Around."
- Nellie's Naughty Magpie Always Sings Pop Songs Clearly After Killing Cathy.
- Shoddy Magician Aligned Six Phones Successfully, Classic Art!
- All Silicon Ports. Superman Clean Argon's K-Capture.

==== Period 4 ====
K (Potassium) Ca Sc Ti V Cr Mn Fe Co Ni Cu Zn Ga Ge As Se Br Kr

- Kindly Cannibals Scare Timid Visitors, 'n' Cruelly Menace Female Communist Nitwits Cuddling Zany Gabbling Geese Astride Several Brutal Kangaroos.
- In reverse order: Kry Brother! SeAs of Germany and Gaul sink copper ships Nice and Cold From Manx to Crimea, Vancouver to Timor, and Scandinavia to the California Koast.
- Kind Cats Scare Tiny Vicious Creatures, Maintaining Feline Connections Nice, Cute & Zen. Gallium Germinates As Selene Brings Krypton.

==== Period 5 ====
Rb Sr Y Zr Nb Mo Tc Ru Rh Pd Ag (Silver) Cd In Sn (Tin) Sb (Antimony) Te I Xe

- Ruby, Sir, Yells "Zircon Nebulas !". Most Technicians Rule Rhodes and Paddle Against Cadence. India Sent Sebastian to Tell "Io Xe."
- Ruby Stuck in Yuck Zoo, Nice Monk Tackled Rude Rhino. Pay Silver Coin In Tin And Tell I eXeed.

=== Transition metals ===
==== First ====
Sc Ti V Cr Mn Fe Co Ni Cu Zn

- Scary Tiny Vicious Creatures are Mean; Females Come to NightClub Zen.
- Scary Tiny Vicious Creatures Might Fear Cows and Nice Cute Zebras.
- SucTion VelCro Man Fears CoNiC uZi.
- ScienTist ViCroMan Iron(Fe) Comes from NiCuZan.

==== Second ====
Y Zr Nb Mo Tc Ru Rh Pd Ag Cd

- Yes S(Z)ir, Nob. Most Technicians Ruin Rob's Pale Silver Cadillac.

==== Third ====
Lu Hf Ta W Re Os Ir Pt Au Hg

- Lucifer's Half Taken, Wendy Reached Out H(I)er Plate Audibly, Helga.
- Lucky Harry Took Walk, Reached Office In Pants, After an Hour.
- Lucky Horned-Fox's Tail got Wet. Restless Ostrich Irrelevantly Painted Gold(AU) on Mercury(HG).

=== Lanthanides and actinides ===
==== Lanthanides ====
La Ce Pr Nd Pm Sm Eu Gd Tb Dy Ho Er Tm Yb (Lu)

- Last Century Presented New Democratic Prime Minister. Smart European Government Decided To Ban Dirty Hotels Entirely To Make Yellow Buildings Luxurious.
- Ladies Can't Put Needles Properly in Slot-machines. Every Girl Tries Daily, However, Every Time You'd Lose.
- Languid Centaurs Praise Ned's Promise of Small European Garden Tubs; Dinosaurs Hobble Erratically Thrumming Yellow Lutes.
- Lately, Central Park Needed Primroses. Small Entire Golden Tassels, Dyeing the Hollow Earth, Tempting Your Love.

==== Actinides ====
Ac Th Pa U Np Pu Am Cm Bk Cf Es Fm Md No (Lr)

- Radiant Acting Thoroughly Protects yoUr Nepotism, Plutocratic America Cures-me & Berkeley California, Einstein Firmly Mended Noble Lawreins.
- Ace Thor Protects Uranus, Neptune, and Pluto. Army Cured Bark. In California Einstein and Fermi Made Noble Laws.
- Actually Thor Protects Uranus, Neptune, and Pluto. Army Cured Bark. In California Einstein and Fermi Made Noble Laws.

=== 56 elements in sequence ===
H He Li Be B C N O F Ne Na Mg Al Si P S Cl Ar
K Ca Sc Ti V Cr Mn Fe Co Ni Cu Zn Ga Ge As Se Br Kr
Rb Sr Y Zr Nb Mo Tc Ru Rh Pd Ag Cd In Sn Sb Te I Xe
Cs Ba

Here Lies Benjamin Bones. Cry Not Oh Friend Needlessly. Nature Magnifies All Simple People Sometimes Clowns And Kings Can Scream Till Vast Crowds Moan. Fear Conquers Neither Courageous Zealous Gallant Gents. As Seen Brown Karate Robes Strip Yobs. Zurich Noble Mortals Track Ruddy Rhubarb. Paid Silver Candid Indian Sons Sobbing Tears In Xcess Cease Bawling.

=== Groups ===
==== Group 1 (alkali metals) ====
Li Na K Rb Cs Fr

Lithium, Sodium, Potassium, Rubidium, Caesium, Francium

- Little Nasty Kids Rub Cats Fur.
- Little Naughty Kids Robs Cents From (me).
- Little Naughty Kids Ruin Ben's Convenient Store Forever.
- Little Nathan Knew Rubies Cost Fortunes.
- Little Naughty Kids Rob Crispy Fries.

==== Group 2 (alkaline earth metals) ====
Be Mg Ca Sr Ba Ra

Beryllium, Magnesium, Calcium, Strontium, Barium, Radium

- Bearded Muggers Came Straight Back Rapidly.
- Beer Mugs Can Serve Bar Rats.
- Ben Meg & Casia Stroll away to Bar of Radium.

==== Group 13 ====
B Al Ga In Tl Nh

Boron, Aluminium, Gallium, Indium, Thallium, Nihonium

- BAlm Game In Tail.
- Bowler Ali Gave Instant Tea.
- BAG IT.
- Bears Always Gave Indians Trouble.

==== Group 14 ====
C Si Ge Sn Pb

Carbon, Silicon, Germanium, Tin (stannum in Latin), Lead (plumbum in Latin)

- CSI Gets Stan Plums. (comment: plum and plumb are homophones)
- Can Simple Germans Snare (Tiny) Public (Lead)?
- Chemistry Sir Gets Snacks Publicly.
- Can Someone Get Some Peanutbutter?

==== Group 15 (Pnictogens) ====
N P As Sb Bi Mc

Nitrogen, Phosphorus, Arsenic, Antimony, Bismuth, Moscovium.

- No Person can Assassinate Sebastian Billy in Moscow (place).

==== Group 16 (Chalcogens) ====
O S Se Te Po Lv

Oxygen, Sulfur, Selenium, Tellurium, Polonium

- Old Style Sets TemPo.
- Old TSangpo Seems Terribly Polluted Lately.
- Ottoman Sultan Sends Textiles to Poor Ladies.

==== Group 17 (Halogens) ====
F Cl Br I At Ts

Fluorine, Chlorine, Bromine, Iodine, Astatine, Tennessine

- Funny Clowns Broil Innocent Ants.
- Fast Clouds Break In Atlantis.
- Father Clark B(r)lesses Ivan A(s)tlast.
- First Class Briyani In Australia.

==== Group 18 (noble gases) ====
He Ne Ar Kr Xe Rn

Helium, Neon, Argon, Krypton, Xenon, Radon.

- Hero Never Argues, Kryptonite Xterminates Rao.
- Hero Needs Arguable Kryptic Xes. Right-on.
- He Never Arrived; Karen eXited with Ron.
- He Needs A Kickin', Xylophone-playin' Racehorse! (And... Oh, gee, now we need to add Oganesson (Og)!)
- Hey, N(e)ArK(r)s, Run, O.g!

== Properties of elements ==
=== Abundance of elements on Earth's crust ===
[Oxygen(O)] > [Silicon(Si)] > [Aluminium(Al)] > [Iron(Fe)] > [Calcium(Ca)] > [Sodium (Na)] > [Potassium(K)] > [Magnesium (Mg)]
(The rest makes only 1%)

- Only Strong Athletes In College Study Past Midnight.
- Oh, see(Si), Alfie(Fe) Cannot(Na) Kiss Meg(Mg).

As they are present in trace quantities they are measured in parts per million (ppm).

=== Activity series of metals ===
Potassium > Sodium > Calcium > Magnesium > Aluminium > (Carbon)* > Zinc > Chromium > Iron > Tin > Lead > (Hydrogen)* > Copper> Mercury > Silver > Gold > Platinum

- Please Stop Calling Me A Cute Zebra Crab I Like Her Call Smart Goat.
- Please Stop Calling Me A Carless Zebra Crab Instead Try Learning How Copper Miners Save Gold Pit.
- Popular Scientists Can Make A Zoo In Low Humid Climate...

Note that carbon and hydrogen are non-metals, used as a baseline.

K > Na > Mg > Al > Zn > Cr > Fe > Pb > H > Cu > Au

- Kangaroos Naturally Muck About in Zoos For Purple Hippos Chasing Aardvarks.
- Katty's Naughty Cat Mingled with Alice and Zarina; Fearlessly Plundering Her Cupboard of Gold.
- Papa Said Call Me After Zinc Interacts Tin Leading Hydrogen Co-operate Mr. Sylvester to Gain Popularity.

K > Na > Ca > Mg > Al > Zn > Fe > Ni > Sn > Pb > Cu > Ag > Au > Pt

- Pretty (Potassium) Sally (Sodium) Could (Calcium) Marry (Magnesium) A (Aluminium) Crazy (Carbon) Zulu (Zinc) IN (Iron/Nickel) Tree (Tin) Lined (Lead) House (Hydrogen) Causing (Copper) Strangely (Silver) Glancing (Gold) People (Platinum).

Li > K > Ba > Sr > Ca > Na > Mg > Al > Mn > Zn > Cr > Fe > Cd > Co > Ni > Sn > Pb

=== Electronegativity ===
Fluorine > Oxygen > Chlorine > Nitrogen > Bromine > Iodine > Sulfur > Carbon > Hydrogen ≥ Phosphorus

- Pronounce: FOClN BrIS CHP.

First Off, Clean Now; Bring In Some Clothes, Hats, and Pants. (First off, clean now. Bring in some caps, hats {and} pants.)

=== Electrochemical series ===
Potassium > Sodium > Calcium > Magnesium > Aluminium > Zinc > Iron > Tin > Lead > Hydrogen > Copper > Silver > Gold

- Paddy Still Could Marry A Zulu In The Lovely Honolulu Causing Strange Gazes.
- Passive Sarcasm Can Mutate Angry Zombies InTo Large Hypocritical Cold Sexy Guys.
- Poor Science Course Makes A Zany Idiot Totally Lose His Composure, Sir! Good!

== Reactions and ions ==
=== Redox reactions ===
A redox reaction is a chemical reaction in which there is a change in oxidation state of atoms participating in the reaction.

=== Ions ===
An atom (or ion) whose oxidation number increases in a redox reaction is said to be oxidized (and is called a reducing agent). It is accomplished by loss of one or more electrons. The atom whose oxidation number decreases gains (receives) one or more electrons and is said to be reduced. This relation can be remembered by the following mnemonics:

- Leo says Ger! or Leo the lion, Ger! can be used to represent Loss of electron is oxidation; Gain of electron is reduction.
- Oil Rig: Oxidation is loss; Reduction is gain (of electrons).

=== Cations and anions ===
Cations are positively (+) charged ions, while anions are negatively (−) charged ions. This can be remembered by the following mnemonics:

- Cats have paws ⇔ Cations are pawsitive.
- Cations are Plussy Cats.
- Ca+ion: The letter t in cation looks like a + (plus) sign.
- An anion is a negative ion. (An~~egative~~ion ⇒ Anion).

=== Oxidation vs. reduction: electrochemical cell and electron gain/loss ===
- AN OIL RIG CAT
  - At the ANode, Oxidation Involves Loss of electrons.
  - Reduction Involves Gaining electrons at the CAThode.
- LOAN – Left Anode Oxidation Negative
  - In written representation of galvanic cell, anode is written on the left. It is the electrode where oxidation takes place. It is the negative electrode. Obviously, the opposite properties (Right/Cathode/Reduction/Positive) are found on the cathode. Hence, by remembering LOAN mnemonic, we can arrive at the corresponding properties for the cathode.
- LEO the lion says GER [grr]
  - "Loss of Electrons, Oxidation; Gain of Electrons, Reduction".

=== Electrodes ===
An electrode in which oxidation takes place is called an anode, while in that which reduction takes place is called a cathode. This applies for both electrolytic and electrochemical cells, though the charge on them reverses. The red cat and an ox mnemonics are useful to remember the same.

- Red cat: Reduction at cathode. An ox: Anode for oxidation.
- PANIC: Positive Anode, Negative Is Cathode.
- Fat Cat: electrons flow From Anode To Cathode.
- LOAN: Left side; Oxidation; Anode; Negative.
- ACID: Anode Current Into Device.

Another memorization key is that the words oxidation and anode both begin with vowels, while both reduction and cathode begin with consonants.

== Compounds ==
=== Diatomic molecules ===
Molecules exhibiting diatomic structures can be remembered through the following mnemonics.

Hydrogen, Oxygen, Nitrogen, Fluorine, Chlorine, Bromine, Iodine

- Have No Fear Of Ice Cold Beer.
- Horses Need Oats For Clear Brown Eyes (I's).
- Her Nana's Only Functioning Clicker Broke Instantly.
- BrINClHOF: say Brinkelhof.
- I Bring Clay For Our New House.
- CHINFOB
- HONClBrIF: say honk-le-brif.
- Captain HOFBrINCl says "Don't forget diatomic elements!"
- HONey it's the Halogens (Hydrogen, Oxygen, Nitrogen, plus the Halogens).

=== Hydrogen bonds ===
Hydrogen forms hydrogen bonds with three elements: nitrogen (N), oxygen (O) and fluorine (F). The names of these elements can be remembered by the following mnemonic:

- Hydrogen is FON! (fun)
- Hydrogen likes to have FON!

=== Polyatomic ions: -ate and -ite ions ===
Sulfite, Phosphite, Carbonate, Chlorate, Bromate, Iodate, Nitrate

- Super Popeye Constantly Clubbed Brutus In Nevada.

Nitrate, Bromate, Carbonate, Iodate, Chlorate, Chromate, Sulfate, Phosphate

- Nick Brit the Camel ate an Inky Clam with Crêpes for Supper in Phoenix.

The number of consonants denotes the number of oxygen atoms. The number of vowels denotes negative charge quantity. Inclusion of the word "ate" signifies that each ends with the letters a-t-e. To use this for the -ite ions, simply subtract one oxygen but keep the charge the same.

== Organic chemistry ==
=== Prefixes for naming carbon chains ===
The prefixes for naming carbon chains containing one to four carbons. For chains containing five or more carbons, the inorganic prefixes (e.g. pent = 5, hept = 7) are used.

Meth	Eth	Prop	But
1	2	3	4

- Monkeys Eat Peeled Bananas.
- Most Elephants Poop Bananas.

For the first five chains.

- Many Elephants Pee Behind Plants.
- Mom Eats Pretty Big Pears.

=== Carboxylic acids ===
Common names of homogeneous aliphatic carboxylic acids:

Formic, Acetic, Propionic, Butyric, Valeric, Caproic

- Frogs Are Polite, Being Very Courteous.

=== Dicarboxylic acids ===
The sequence of dicarboxylic acids can be remembered with following mnemonics.

Oxalic, Malonic, Succinic, Glutaric, Adipic, Pimelic, Suberic, Azelaic, Sebacic

- OMSGAPS – a phonetic word for the first letters of the first seven dicarboxylic acids above in sequence can be said as below.
- Oh My, Such Good Apples.
- Oh My Stars, Green Apples.
- Oh My, Such Good Apple Pie, Sweet As Sugar.
- Oh My Stars, Go Ahead Please.
- Oh My Sir, Give A Party Soon.

=== Aromatic compounds ===
==== m-directing groups ====
Quaternary amino	Ester	Sulfonic acid	Nitro	Carbonyl	Carboxyl	Cyano
(-NR_{3}^{+})	(-COOR)	(-SO_{3}H)	(-NO_{2})	(-CHO)	(-COOH)	(-CN)

- Queen Elizabeth Second's Navy Commands, Controls, Communicates.

==== o,p-directing groups ====
Alkyl	Halogen	Alkoxyl	Amino			Hydroxyl	Amide	Phenyl
(R)	(X)	(OR)	(-NH_{2}	-NHR	-NR_{2})	(OH)	(NHCOR	(C_{6}H_{5})

- AHA AHA P.

Note: -NH_{2},-NHR and NR_{2} are para directing groups but not -NR_{3}^{+}.

=== E–Z notation for isomers ===
"E" for 'enemies'. i.e. higher priority groups on opposite sides. Z form has higher priority groups on same side.

"Z" means 'zame zide' (same side), i.e. high priority groups on same side.

=== Cis–trans isomerism ===
Cis starts with a C and the functional groups form a C.

Trans, therefore, is the other one by default.

=== Benzene ring: order of substitutes ===
From R group moving around the ring:

R group, Ortho, Meta, Para

- Benzene likes to ROMP.

== Biochemistry ==
=== Nutrients ===
The four most common elements in living organisms – carbon, hydrogen, oxygen, and nitrogen – may be remembered with the acronym CHON. An extensions is CHNOPS, which adds phosphorus and sulfur.

Elements necessary for agriculture:

Carbon, Hydrogen, Calcium, Iron (Fe), Magnesium (Mg), Manganese (Mn), Copper (Cu), Molybdenum, Chlorine (Cl), Boron

- C (see) Hopkins CaFe, Mighty-good Man, Cu (see your) Money, hope they are Closed or out of Business.

Macronutrients:

Carbon, Hydrogen, Oxygen, Phosphorus, Potassium, Nitrogen, Sulfur, Calcium, and Magnesium

- C. HOPKiN'S Ca Mg (C. Hopkins coffee mug).
- MagiCal CKN SHOP (Magical Chicken SHOP).

Elements comprising the human body:

Iodine, Phosphorus, Carbon, Oxygen, Hydrogen, Nitrogen, Sulfur, Calcium (Ca), Iron (Fe)

- Chopin's CaFe
- I.P. Cohn's CaFe

=== Essential amino acids ===
Isoleucine, Leucine, Lysine, Arginine, Methionine, Phenylalanine, Threonine, Tryptophan, Histidine, Valine

- PVT TIM HaLL and TT HALL Very IMPortant.
- These Ten Valuable Acids Have Long Preserved Life In Men.
- MATT HILL, VP
- LIFT HIM KIW(V)I
- TV FILM HW(R)K.
- FM TK HW RIVL
- Any Help In Learning These Little Molecules Proves Truly Valuable. (this mnemonic begins with the two amino acids that need some qualifications as to their requirements.)

=== Krebs cycle ===
To remember the Krebs cycle (citric acid cycle, tricarboxylic acid cycle):

Citrate → Aconitate → Isocitrate → Oxalosuccinate → α-Ketoglutarate → Succinate → Fumarate → Malate → Oxaloacetate

- Caesar's Armies Invaded Other Kingdoms Searching For Many Oranges.
- Citric Acid Is One Key Substrate For Mitochondrial Oxidation.

== See also ==
- List of medical mnemonics
- List of mnemonics
