= Intrinsic semiconductor =

Pure semiconductor without any significant dopant species present

An intrinsic semiconductor, also called a pure semiconductor, undoped semiconductor or i-type semiconductor, is a semiconductor without any significant dopant species present. The number of charge carriers is therefore determined by the properties of the material itself instead of the amount of impurities. In intrinsic semiconductors the number of excited electrons and the number of holes are equal: n = p, as a direct consequence of charge neutrality for the semiconductor. This may be the case even after doping the semiconductor, though only if it is doped with both donors and acceptors equally. In this case, n = p still holds, and the semiconductor remains intrinsic, though doped. This means that some conductors are both intrinsic as well as extrinsic but only if n (electron donor dopant/excited electrons) is equal to p (electron acceptor dopant/vacant holes that act as positive charges).

The electrical conductivity of chemically pure semiconductors can still be affected by crystallographic defects of technological origin (like vacancies), some of which can behave similar to dopants. Their effect can often be neglected, though, and the number of electrons in the conduction band is then exactly equal to the number of holes in the valence band. The conduction of current of intrinsic semiconductor is enabled purely by electron excitation across the band-gap, which is usually small at room temperature except for narrow-bandgap semiconductors, like Hg_{0.8}Cd_{0.2}Te.

The conductivity of a semiconductor can be modeled in terms of the band theory of solids. The band model of a semiconductor suggests that at ordinary temperatures there is a finite possibility that electrons can reach the conduction band and contribute to electrical conduction. A silicon crystal is different from an insulator because at any temperature above absolute zero, there is a non-zero probability that an electron in the lattice will be knocked loose from its position, leaving behind an electron deficiency called a "hole". If a voltage is applied, then both the electron and the hole can contribute to a small current flow.

== Electrons and holes ==
In an intrinsic semiconductor such as silicon at temperatures above absolute zero, there will be some electrons which are excited across the band gap into the conduction band and these electrons can support charge flowing. When the electron in pure silicon crosses the gap, it leaves behind an electron vacancy or "hole" in the regular silicon lattice. Under the influence of an external voltage, both the electron and the hole can move across the material. In an n-type semiconductor, the dopant contributes extra electrons, dramatically increasing the conductivity. In a p-type semiconductor, the dopant produces extra vacancies or holes, which likewise increase the conductivity. It is however the behavior of the p–n junction which is the key to the enormous variety of solid-state electronic devices.

== Semiconductor current ==
The current which will flow in an intrinsic semiconductor consists of both electron and hole current. That is, the electrons which have been freed from their lattice positions into the conduction band can move through the material. In addition, other electrons can hop between lattice positions to fill the vacancies left by the freed electrons. This additional mechanism is called hole conduction because it is as if the holes are migrating across the material in the direction opposite to the free electron movement. The current flow in an intrinsic semiconductor is influenced by the density of energy states which in turn influences the electron density in the conduction band. This current is highly temperature dependent.

== See also ==
- Extrinsic semiconductor
  - N-type semiconductor
  - P-type semiconductor
