= Donor (semiconductors) =

Dopant atom that can form a n-type region

In semiconductor physics, a donor is a dopant atom that, when added to a semiconductor, can form a n-type region.

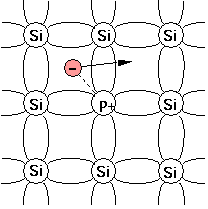
Phosphorus atom acting as a donor in the simplified 2D silicon lattice.

For example, when silicon (Si), having four valence electrons, is to be doped as a n-type semiconductor, elements from group V like phosphorus (P) or arsenic (As) can be used because they have five valence electrons. A dopant with five valence electrons is also called a pentavalent impurity. Other pentavalent dopants are antimony (Sb) and bismuth (Bi).

When substituting a Si atom in the crystal lattice, four of the valence electrons of phosphorus form covalent bonds with the neighbouring Si atoms but the fifth one remains weakly bonded. If that electron is liberated, the initially electro-neutral donor becomes positively charged (ionised). At room temperature, the liberated electron can move around the Si crystal and carry a current, thus acting as a charge carrier.

== See also ==
- Acceptor (semiconductors)
- Electron donor
