= Acceptor (semiconductors) =

Dopant atom that, when added to a semiconductor, can form a p-type region

In semiconductor physics, an acceptor is a dopant atom that when substituted into a semiconductor lattice forms a p-type region.

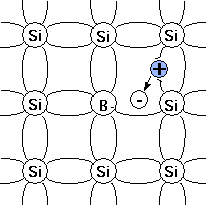
Boron atom acting as an acceptor in the simplified 2D silicon lattice.

When silicon (Si), having four valence electrons, is doped with elements from group III of the periodic table, such as boron (B) and aluminium (Al), both having three valence electrons, a p-type semiconductor is formed. These dopant elements represent trivalent impurities. Other trivalent dopants include indium (In) and gallium (Ga).

When substituting for a silicon atom in the crystal lattice, the three valence electrons of boron form covalent bonds with three of the Si neighbours but the bond with the fourth remains unsatisfied. The initially electro-neutral acceptor becomes negatively charged (ionised). The unsatisfied bond attracts electrons from the neighbouring bonds. At room temperature, an electron from a neighbouring bond can jump to repair the unsatisfied bond thus leaving an electron hole, which is a place where an electron is deficient. The hole, being positively charged, attracts another electron from a neighbouring bond to repair this unsatisfied bond. This chain-like process results in the hole moving around the crystal as a charge carrier. This process can sustain in an electric current useful in electronic circuits.

== See also ==
- Donor (semiconductors)
- Electron acceptor
- Semiconductors
