= Valence and conduction bands =

Electron energy bands which determine the electrical conductivity of a material

Filling of the electronic states in various types of materials at equilibrium. Here, height is energy while width is the density of available states for a certain energy in the material listed. The shade follows the Fermi–Dirac distribution (black: all states filled, white: no state filled). In metals and semimetals the Fermi level E_{F} lies inside at least one band. In insulators and semiconductors the Fermi level is inside a band gap; however, in semiconductors the bands are near enough to the Fermi level to be thermally populated with electrons or holes. "intrin." indicates intrinsic semiconductors.

In solid-state physics, the valence band and conduction band are the bands closest to the Fermi level, and thus determine the electrical conductivity of the solid. In nonmetals, the valence band is the highest range of electron energies in which electrons are normally present at absolute zero temperature, while the conduction band is the lowest range of vacant electronic states. On a graph of the electronic band structure of a semiconducting material, the valence band is located below the Fermi level, while the conduction band is located above it.

The distinction between the valence and conduction bands is meaningless in metals, because conduction occurs in one or more partially filled bands that take on the properties of both the valence and conduction bands.

== Band gap ==
In semiconductors and insulators the two bands are separated by a band gap, while in conductors the bands overlap. A band gap is an energy range in a solid where no electron states can exist due to the quantization of energy. Within the concept of bands, the energy gap between the valence band and the conduction band is the band gap. Electrical conductivity of non-metals is determined by the susceptibility of electrons to be excited from the valence band to the conduction band.

== Electrical conductivity ==
Semiconductor band structure
See electrical conduction and semiconductor for a more detailed description of band structure.

In solids, the ability of electrons to act as charge carriers depends on the availability of vacant electronic states. This allows the electrons to increase their energy (i.e., accelerate) when an electric field is applied. Similarly, holes (empty states) in the almost filled valence band also allow for conductivity.

As such, the electrical conductivity of a solid depends on its capability to flow electrons from the valence to the conduction band. Hence, in the case of a semimetal with an overlap region, the electrical conductivity is high. If there is a small band gap (E_{g}), then the flow of electrons from valence to conduction band is possible only if an external energy (thermal, etc.) is supplied; these groups with small E_{g} are called semiconductors. If the E_{g} is sufficiently high, then the flow of electrons from valence to conduction band becomes negligible under normal conditions; these groups are called insulators.

There is some conductivity in semiconductors, however. This is due to thermal excitation—some of the electrons get enough energy to jump the band gap in one go. Once they are in the conduction band, they can conduct electricity, as can the hole they left behind in the valence band. The hole is an empty state that allows electrons in the valence band some degree of freedom.

== Band edge shifts of semiconductor nanoparticles ==
The edge shifting of size-dependent conduction and/or valence band is a phenomenon being studied in the field of semiconductor nanocrystals. The radius limit of occurrence of the semiconductor nanocrystal is the effective Bohr radius of the nanocrystal. The conduction and/or valence band edges shift to higher energy levels under this radius limit due to discrete optical transitions when semiconductor nanocrystal is restricted by the exciton. As a result of this edge shifting, the size of the conduction and/or valence band is decreased. This size-dependent edge shifting of conduction and/or valence band can provide plenty of useful information regarding the size or concentration of the semiconductor nanoparticles or band structures.

== See also ==
- Electrical conduction for more information about conduction in solids, and another description of band structure.
- Fermi sea
- HOMO/LUMO
- Semiconductor for a full explanation of the band structure of materials.
- Valleytronics
