= Extrinsic semiconductor =

Semiconductor that has been doped

An extrinsic semiconductor is one that has been doped; during manufacture of the semiconductor crystal a trace element or chemical called a doping agent has been incorporated chemically into the crystal, for the purpose of giving it different electrical properties than the pure semiconductor crystal, which is called an intrinsic semiconductor. In an extrinsic semiconductor it is these foreign dopant atoms in the crystal lattice that mainly provide the charge carriers which carry electric current through the crystal. The doping agents used are of two types, resulting in two types of extrinsic semiconductor. An electron donor dopant is an atom which, when incorporated in the crystal, releases a mobile conduction electron into the crystal lattice. An extrinsic semiconductor that has been doped with electron donor atoms is called an n-type semiconductor, because the majority of charge carriers in the crystal are negative electrons. An electron acceptor dopant is an atom which accepts an electron from the lattice, creating a vacancy where an electron should be called a hole which can move through the crystal like a positively charged particle. An extrinsic semiconductor which has been doped with electron acceptor atoms is called a p-type semiconductor, because the majority of charge carriers in the crystal are positive holes.

Doping is the key to the extraordinarily wide range of electrical behavior that semiconductors can exhibit, and extrinsic semiconductors are used to make semiconductor electronic devices such as diodes, transistors, integrated circuits, semiconductor lasers, LEDs, and photovoltaic cells. Sophisticated semiconductor fabrication processes like photolithography can implant different dopant elements in different regions of the same semiconductor crystal wafer, creating semiconductor devices on the wafer's surface. For example a common type of transistor, the n-p-n bipolar transistor, consists of an extrinsic semiconductor crystal with two regions of n-type semiconductor, separated by a region of p-type semiconductor, with metal contacts attached to each part.

== Conduction in semiconductors ==
A solid substance can conduct electric current only if it contains charged particles, electrons, which are free to move about and not attached to atoms. In a metal conductor, it is the metal atoms that provide the electrons; typically each metal atom releases one of its outer orbital electrons to become a conduction electron which can move about throughout the crystal, and carry electric current. Therefore the number of conduction electrons in a metal is equal to the number of atoms, a very large number, making metals good conductors.

Unlike in metals, the atoms that make up the bulk semiconductor crystal do not provide the electrons which are responsible for conduction. In semiconductors, electrical conduction is due to the mobile charge carriers, electrons or holes which are provided by impurities or dopant atoms in the crystal. In an extrinsic semiconductor, the concentration of doping atoms in the crystal largely determines the density of charge carriers, which determines its electrical conductivity, as well as a great many other electrical properties. This is the key to semiconductors' versatility; their conductivity can be manipulated over many orders of magnitude by doping.

== Semiconductor doping ==
Semiconductor doping is the process that changes an intrinsic semiconductor to an extrinsic semiconductor. During doping, impurity atoms are introduced to an intrinsic semiconductor. Impurity atoms are atoms of a different element than the atoms of the intrinsic semiconductor. Impurity atoms act as either donors or acceptors to the intrinsic semiconductor, changing the electron and hole concentrations of the semiconductor. Impurity atoms are classified as either donor or acceptor atoms based on the effect they have on the intrinsic semiconductor.

Donor impurity atoms have more valence electrons than the atoms they replace in the intrinsic semiconductor lattice. Donor impurities "donate" their extra valence electrons to a semiconductor's conduction band, providing excess electrons to the intrinsic semiconductor. Excess electrons increase the electron carrier concentration (n_{0}) of the semiconductor, making it n-type.

Acceptor impurity atoms have fewer valence electrons than the atoms they replace in the intrinsic semiconductor lattice. They "accept" electrons from the semiconductor's valence band. This provides excess holes to the intrinsic semiconductor. Excess holes increase the hole carrier concentration (p_{0}) of the semiconductor, creating a p-type semiconductor.

Semiconductors and dopant atoms are defined by the column of the periodic table in which they fall. The column definition of the semiconductor determines how many valence electrons its atoms have and whether dopant atoms act as the semiconductor's donors or acceptors.

Group IV semiconductors use group V atoms as donors and group III atoms as acceptors.

Group III–V semiconductors, the compound semiconductors, use group VI atoms as donors and group II atoms as acceptors. Group III–V semiconductors can also use group IV atoms as either donors or acceptors. When a group IV atom replaces the group III element in the semiconductor lattice, the group IV atom acts as a donor. Conversely, when a group IV atom replaces the group V element, the group IV atom acts as an acceptor. Group IV atoms can act as both donors and acceptors; therefore, they are known as amphoteric impurities.

	Intrinsic semiconductor	Donor atoms (n-type semiconductor)	Acceptor atoms (p-type semiconductor)
Group IV semiconductors	Silicon, germanium	Phosphorus, arsenic, antimony	Boron, aluminium, gallium
Group III–V semiconductors	Aluminum phosphide, aluminum arsenide, gallium arsenide, gallium nitride	Selenium, tellurium, silicon, germanium	Beryllium, zinc, magnesium, cadmium, silicon, germanium

== The two types of semiconductor ==
=== N-type semiconductors ===
Band structure of an n-type semiconductor. Dark circles in the conduction band are electrons and light circles in the valence band are holes. The image shows that the electrons are the majority charge carrier.

N-type semiconductors are created by doping an intrinsic semiconductor with an electron donor element during manufacture. The term n-type comes from the negative charge of the electron. In n-type semiconductors, electrons are the majority carriers and holes are the minority carriers. A common dopant for n-type silicon is phosphorus or arsenic. In an n-type semiconductor, the Fermi level is greater than that of the intrinsic semiconductor and lies closer to the conduction band than the valence band.

Examples: phosphorus, arsenic, antimony, etc.

=== P-type semiconductors ===
Band structure of a p-type semiconductor. Dark circles in the conduction band are electrons and light circles in the valence band are holes. The image shows that the holes are the majority charge carrier.

P-type semiconductors are created by doping an intrinsic semiconductor with an electron acceptor element during manufacture. The term p-type refers to the positive charge of a hole. As opposed to n-type semiconductors, p-type semiconductors have a larger hole concentration than electron concentration. In p-type semiconductors, holes are the majority carriers and electrons are the minority carriers. A common p-type dopant for silicon is boron or gallium. For p-type semiconductors the Fermi level is below the intrinsic semiconductor and lies closer to the valence band than the conduction band.

Examples: boron, aluminium, gallium, etc.

== Use of extrinsic semiconductors ==
Extrinsic semiconductors are components of many common electrical devices. A semiconductor diode (devices that allow current in only one direction) consists of p-type and n-type semiconductors placed in junction with one another. Currently, most semiconductor diodes use doped silicon or germanium.

Transistors (devices that enable current switching) also make use of extrinsic semiconductors. Bipolar junction transistors (BJT), which amplify current, are one type of transistor. The most common BJTs are NPN and PNP type. NPN transistors have two layers of n-type semiconductors sandwiching a p-type semiconductor. PNP transistors have two layers of p-type semiconductors sandwiching an n-type semiconductor.

Field-effect transistors (FET) are another type of transistor which amplify current implementing extrinsic semiconductors. As opposed to BJTs, they are called unipolar because they involve single carrier type operation – either N-channel or P-channel. FETs are broken into two families, junction gate FET (JFET), which are three-terminal semiconductors, and insulated gate FET (IGFET), which are four-terminal semiconductors.

Other devices implementing the extrinsic semiconductor:

- Lasers
- Solar cells
- Photodetectors
- Light-emitting diodes
- Thyristors

== See also ==
- Intrinsic semiconductor
- Doping (semiconductor)
- List of semiconductor materials
