= Charge carrier =

Free-moving particle which carries an electric charge

In solid state physics, a charge carrier is a particle or quasiparticle that is free to move, carrying an electric charge, especially the particles that carry electric charges in electrical conductors. Examples are electrons, ions and holes. In a conducting medium, an electric field can exert force on these free particles, causing a net motion of the particles through the medium; this is what constitutes an electric current. The electron and the proton are the elementary charge carriers, each carrying one elementary charge (e), of the same magnitude and opposite sign.

== In conductors ==
In conducting mediums, particles serve to carry charge. In many metals, the charge carriers are electrons. One or two of the valence electrons from each atom are able to move about freely within the crystal structure of the metal. The free electrons are referred to as conduction electrons, and the cloud of free electrons is called a Fermi gas. Many metals have electron and hole bands. In some, the majority carriers are holes.

In electrolytes, such as salt water, the charge carriers are ions, which are atoms or molecules that have gained or lost electrons so they are electrically charged. Atoms that have gained electrons so they are negatively charged are called anions, atoms that have lost electrons so they are positively charged are called cations. Cations and anions of the dissociated liquid also serve as charge carriers in melted ionic solids (see e.g. the Hall–Héroult process for an example of electrolysis of a melted ionic solid). Proton conductors are electrolytic conductors employing positive hydrogen ions as carriers.

In a plasma, an electrically charged gas which is found in electric arcs through air, neon signs, and the sun and stars, the electrons and cations of ionized gas act as charge carriers.

In a vacuum, free electrons can act as charge carriers. In the electronic component known as the vacuum tube (also called valve), the mobile electron cloud is generated by a heated metal cathode, by a process called thermionic emission. When an electric field is applied strongly enough to draw the electrons into a beam, this may be referred to as a cathode ray, and is the basis of the cathode-ray tube display widely used in televisions and computer monitors until the 2000s.

In semiconductors, which are the materials used to make electronic components like transistors and integrated circuits, two types of charge carrier are possible. In p-type semiconductors, "effective particles" known as electron holes with positive charge move through the crystal lattice, producing an electric current. The "holes" are, in effect, electron vacancies in the valence-band electron population of the semiconductor and are treated as charge carriers because they are mobile, moving from atom site to atom site. In n-type semiconductors, electrons in the conduction band move through the crystal, resulting in an electric current.

In some conductors, such as ionic solutions and plasmas, positive and negative charge carriers coexist, so in these cases an electric current consists of the two types of carrier moving in opposite directions. In other conductors, such as metals, there are only charge carriers of one polarity, so an electric current in them simply consists of charge carriers moving in one direction.

== In semiconductors ==
There are two recognized types of charge carriers in semiconductors. One is electrons, which carry a negative electric charge. In addition, it is convenient to treat the traveling vacancies in the valence band electron population (holes) as a second type of charge carrier, which carry a positive charge equal in magnitude to that of an electron.

=== Carrier generation and recombination ===
When an electron meets with a hole, they recombine and these free carriers effectively vanish. The energy released can be either thermal, heating up the semiconductor (thermal recombination, one of the sources of waste heat in semiconductors), or released as photons (optical recombination, used in LEDs and semiconductor lasers). The recombination means an electron which has been excited from the valence band to the conduction band falls back to the empty state in the valence band, known as the holes. The holes are the empty states created in the valence band when an electron gets excited after getting some energy to pass the energy gap.

=== Majority and minority carriers ===
The more abundant charge carriers are called majority carriers, which are primarily responsible for current transport in a piece of semiconductor. In n-type semiconductors they are electrons, while in p-type semiconductors they are holes. The less abundant charge carriers are called minority carriers; in n-type semiconductors they are holes, while in p-type semiconductors they are electrons. The concentration of holes and electrons in a doped semiconductor is governed by the mass action law.

In an intrinsic semiconductor, which does not contain any impurity, the concentrations of both types of carriers are ideally equal. If an intrinsic semiconductor is doped with a donor impurity then the majority carriers are electrons. If the semiconductor is doped with an acceptor impurity then the majority carriers are holes.

Minority carriers play an important role in bipolar transistors and solar cells. Their role in field-effect transistors (FETs) is a bit more complex: for example, a MOSFET has p-type and n-type regions. The transistor action involves the majority carriers of the source and drain regions, but these carriers traverse the body of the opposite type, where they are minority carriers. However, the traversing carriers hugely outnumber their opposite type in the transfer region (in fact, the opposite type carriers are removed by an applied electric field that creates an inversion layer), so conventionally the source and drain designation for the carriers is adopted, and FETs are called "majority carrier" devices.

=== Free carrier concentration ===
Free carrier concentration is the concentration of free carriers in a doped semiconductor. It is similar to the carrier concentration in a metal and for the purposes of calculating currents or drift velocities can be used in the same way. Free carriers are electrons (holes) that have been introduced into the conduction band (valence band) by doping. Therefore, they will not act as double carriers by leaving behind holes (electrons) in the other band. In other words, charge carriers are particles that are free to move, carrying the charge. The free carrier concentration of doped semiconductors shows a characteristic temperature dependence.

== In superconductors ==
Superconductors have zero electrical resistance and are therefore able to carry current indefinitely. This type of conduction is possible by the formation of Cooper pairs. At present, superconductors can only be achieved at very low temperatures, for instance by using cryogenic chilling. As yet, achieving superconductivity at room temperature remains challenging; it is still a field of ongoing research and experimentation. Creating a superconductor that functions at ambient temperature would constitute an important technological break-through, which could potentially contribute to much higher energy efficiency in grid distribution of electricity.

== In quantum situations ==
Under exceptional circumstances, positrons, muons, anti-muons, taus and anti-taus may potentially also carry electric charge. This is theoretically possible, yet the very short life-time of these charged particles would render such a current very challenging to maintain at the current state of technology. It might be possible to artificially create this type of current, or it might occur in nature during very short lapses of time.

== In plasmas ==
Plasmas consist of ionized gas. Electric charge can cause the formation of electromagnetic fields in plasmas, which can lead to the formation of currents or even multiple currents. This phenomenon is used in nuclear fusion reactors. It also occurs naturally in the cosmos, in the form of jets, nebula winds or cosmic filaments that carry charged particles. This cosmic phenomenon is called Birkeland current. Considered in general, the electric conductivity of plasmas is a subject of plasma physics.

== See also ==
- Carrier lifetime
- Free charge
- Molecular diffusion
- Point charge
- Charger
