= Semiconductor =

Material of moderate electrical conductivity

A semiconductor is a material with electrical conductivity between that of a conductor and an insulator. Its conductivity can be modified by adding impurities ("doping") to its crystal structure. When two regions with different doping levels are present in the same crystal, they form a semiconductor junction. The term "semiconductors" is sometimes used to refer to semiconductor devices such as microchips and computer processors, which work using the physical properties of semiconductors.

The behavior of charge carriers, which include electrons, ions, and electron holes, at these junctions is the basis of diodes, transistors, and most modern electronics. Some examples of semiconductors are silicon, germanium, gallium arsenide, and elements near the so-called "metalloid staircase" on the periodic table. After silicon, gallium arsenide is the second-most common semiconductor and is used in laser diodes, solar cells, microwave-frequency integrated circuits, and others. Silicon is a critical element for fabricating most electronic circuits.

Semiconductor devices can display a range of different useful properties, such as passing current more easily in one direction than the other, showing variable resistance, and having sensitivity to light or heat. Because the electrical properties of a semiconductor material can be modified by doping and by the application of electrical fields or light, devices made from semiconductors can be used for amplification, switching, and energy conversion. The term semiconductor is also used to describe materials used in high capacity, medium- to high-voltage cables as part of their insulation, and these materials are often plastic XLPE (cross-linked polyethylene) with carbon black.

The conductivity of silicon can be increased by adding a small amount (of the order of 1 in 10^{8}) of pentavalent (antimony, phosphorus, or arsenic) or trivalent (boron, gallium, indium) atoms. This process is known as doping, and the resulting semiconductors are known as doped or extrinsic semiconductors. Apart from doping, the conductivity of a semiconductor can be improved by increasing its temperature. This is contrary to the behavior of a metal, in which conductivity decreases with an increase in temperature.

The modern understanding of the properties of a semiconductor relies on quantum physics to explain the movement of charge carriers in a crystal lattice. Doping greatly increases the number of charge carriers within the crystal. When a semiconductor is doped by Group V elements, they will behave like donors creating free electrons, known as "n-type" doping. When a semiconductor is doped by Group III elements, they will behave like acceptors creating free holes, known as "p-type" doping. The semiconductor materials used in electronic devices are doped under precise conditions to control the concentration and regions of p- and n-type dopants. A single semiconductor device crystal can have many p- and n-type regions; the p–n junctions between these regions are responsible for the useful electronic behavior. Using a hot-point probe, one can determine quickly whether a semiconductor sample is p- or n-type.

A few of the properties of semiconductor materials were observed throughout the mid-19th and first decades of the 20th century. The first practical application of semiconductors in electronics was the 1904 development of the cat's-whisker detector, a primitive semiconductor diode used in early radio receivers. Developments in quantum physics led in turn to the invention of the transistor in 1947 and the integrated circuit in 1958.

== Properties ==
=== Variable electrical conductivity ===
Semiconductors in their natural state are poor conductors because a current requires flow of electrons, and semiconductors have their valence bands filled, preventing the entire flow of new electrons. Several developed techniques allow semiconducting materials to behave like conducting materials, such as doping or gating. These modifications have two outcomes: n-type and p-type. These refer to the excess or shortage of electrons, respectively. A balanced number of electrons would cause a current to flow throughout the material.

=== Homojunctions ===
Homojunctions occur when two differently doped semiconducting materials are joined. For example, a configuration could consist of p-doped and n-doped germanium. This results in an exchange of electrons and holes between the differently doped semiconducting materials. The n-doped germanium would have an excess of electrons, and the p-doped germanium would have an excess of holes. The transfer occurs until an equilibrium is reached by a process called recombination, which causes the migrating electrons from the n-type to come in contact with the migrating holes from the p-type. The result of this process is a narrow strip of immobile ions, which causes an electric field across the junction.

== Excited electrons ==
A difference in the electric potential on a semiconducting material would cause it to leave thermal equilibrium and create a non-equilibrium situation. This introduces electrons and holes to the system, which interact via a process called ambipolar diffusion. Whenever thermal equilibrium is disturbed in a semiconducting material, the number of holes and electrons changes. Such disruptions can occur as a result of a temperature difference or photons, which can enter the system and create electrons and holes. The processes that create or annihilate electrons and holes are called generation and recombination, respectively.

=== Light emission ===
In certain semiconductors, excited electrons can relax by emitting light instead of producing heat. Controlling the semiconductor composition and electrical current allows for the manipulation of the emitted light's properties. These semiconductors are used in the construction of light-emitting diodes and fluorescent quantum dots.

=== High thermal conductivity ===
Semiconductors with high thermal conductivity can be used for heat dissipation and improving thermal management of electronics. They play a crucial role in electric vehicles, high-brightness LEDs and power modules, among other applications.

=== Thermal energy conversion ===
Semiconductors have large thermoelectric power factors making them useful in thermoelectric generators, as well as high thermoelectric figures of merit making them useful in thermoelectric coolers.

== Materials ==
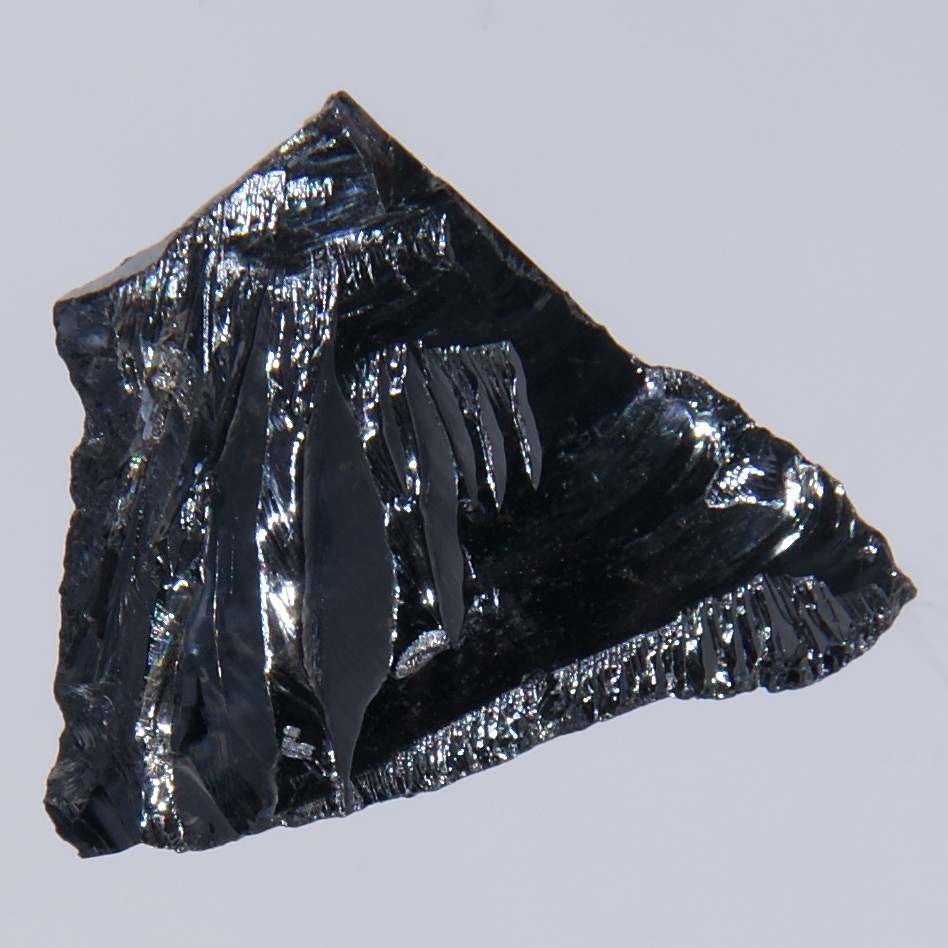
Silicon crystals are the most common semiconducting materials used in microelectronics and photovoltaics.

A large number of elements and compounds have semiconducting properties, including:

- Certain pure elements are found in group 14 of the periodic table; the most commercially important of these elements are silicon and germanium. Silicon and germanium are used here effectively because they have 4 valence electrons in their outermost shell, which gives them the ability to gain or lose electrons equally at the same time.
- Binary compounds, particularly between elements in groups 13 and 15, such as gallium arsenide, groups 12 and 16, groups 14 and 16, and between different group-14 elements, e.g. silicon carbide.
- Certain ternary compounds, oxides, and alloys.
- Organic semiconductors, made of organic compounds.
- Semiconducting metal–organic frameworks.

The most common semiconducting materials are crystalline solids, but amorphous and liquid semiconductors are also known. These include hydrogenated amorphous silicon and mixtures of arsenic, selenium, and tellurium in a variety of proportions. These compounds share with better-known semiconductors the properties of intermediate conductivity and a rapid variation of conductivity with temperature, as well as occasional negative resistance. Such disordered materials lack the rigid crystalline structure of conventional semiconductors such as silicon. They are generally used in thin film structures, which do not require material of higher electronic quality, being relatively insensitive to impurities and radiation damage.

=== Preparation of semiconductor materials ===
Almost all of today's electronic technology involves the use of semiconductors, with the most important aspect being integrated circuits (ICs), which are found in desktop computers, laptops, smartphones, and other electronic devices. Semiconductors for ICs are mass-produced. To create an ideal semiconducting material, chemical purity is paramount. Any small imperfection can have a drastic effect on how the semiconducting material behaves due to the scale at which the materials are used.

A high degree of crystalline perfection is also required, since faults in the crystal structure (such as dislocations, twins, and stacking faults) interfere with the semiconducting properties of the material. Crystalline faults are a major cause of defective semiconductor devices. The larger the crystal, the more difficult it is to achieve the necessary perfection. Current mass production processes use crystal ingots between 100 and 300 mm (3.9 and 11.8 in) in diameter, grown as cylinders and sliced into wafers. The round shape characteristic of these wafers comes from single-crystal ingots usually produced using the Czochralski method. Silicon wafers were first introduced in the 1940s.

There is a combination of processes that are used to prepare semiconducting materials for ICs. One process is called thermal oxidation, which forms silicon dioxide on the surface of the silicon. This is used as a gate insulator and field oxide. Other processes are called photomasks and photolithography. This process is what creates the patterns on the circuit in the integrated circuit. Ultraviolet light is used along with a photoresist layer to create a chemical change that generates the patterns for the circuit.

The etching is the next process that is required. The part of the silicon that was not covered by the photoresist layer from the previous step can now be etched. The main process typically used today is called plasma etching. Plasma etching usually involves an etch gas pumped in a low-pressure chamber to create plasma. A common etch gas is chlorofluorocarbon, or more commonly known Freon. A high radio-frequency voltage between the cathode and anode is what creates the plasma in the chamber. The silicon wafer is located on the cathode, which causes it to be hit by the positively charged ions that are released from the plasma. The result is silicon that is etched anisotropically.

The last process is called diffusion. This is the process that gives the semiconducting material its desired semiconducting properties. It is also known as doping. The process introduces an impure atom to the system, which creates the p–n junction. To get the impure atoms embedded in the silicon wafer, the wafer is first put in a 1,100 degree Celsius chamber. The atoms are injected in and eventually diffuse with the silicon. After the process is completed and the silicon has reached room temperature, the doping process is done and the semiconducting wafer is almost prepared.

== Physics of semiconductors ==
=== Energy bands and electrical conduction ===
Filling of the electronic states in various types of materials at equilibrium. Here, height is energy while width is the density of available states for a certain energy in the material listed. The shade follows the Fermi–Dirac distribution (black: all states filled, white: no state filled). In metals and semimetals the Fermi level E_{F} lies inside at least one band. In insulators and semiconductors the Fermi level is inside a band gap; however, in semiconductors the bands are near enough to the Fermi level to be thermally populated with electrons or holes. "intrin." indicates intrinsic semiconductors.

Semiconductors are defined by their unique electric conductive behavior, somewhere between that of a conductor and an insulator. The differences between these materials can be understood in terms of the quantum states for electrons, each of which may contain zero or one electron (by the Pauli exclusion principle). These states are associated with the electronic band structure of the material. Electrical conductivity arises due to the presence of electrons in states that are delocalized (extending through the material), however in order to transport electrons a state must be partially filled, containing an electron only part of the time. If the state is always occupied with an electron, then it is inert, blocking the passage of other electrons via that state. The energies of these quantum states are critical since a state is partially filled only if its energy is near the Fermi level (see Fermi–Dirac statistics).

High conductivity in a material comes from it having many partially filled states and much state delocalization. Metals are good electrical conductors and have many partially filled states with energies near their Fermi level. Insulators, by contrast, have few partially filled states, their Fermi levels sit within band gaps with few energy states to occupy. Importantly, an insulator can be made to conduct by increasing its temperature: heating provides energy to promote some electrons across the band gap, inducing partially filled states in both the band of states beneath the band gap (valence band) and the band of states above the band gap (conduction band). An (intrinsic) semiconductor has a band gap that is smaller than that of an insulator and at room temperature, significant numbers of electrons can be excited to cross the band gap.

A pure semiconductor, however, is not very useful, as it is neither a very good insulator nor a very good conductor. However, one important feature of semiconductors (and some insulators, known as semi-insulators) is that their conductivity can be increased and controlled by doping with impurities and gating with electric fields. Doping and gating move either the conduction or valence band much closer to the Fermi level and greatly increase the number of partially filled states.

Some wider-bandgap semiconductor materials are sometimes referred to as semi-insulators. When undoped, these have electrical conductivity nearer to that of electrical insulators, however they can be doped (making them as useful as semiconductors). Semi-insulators find niche applications in micro-electronics, such as substrates for HEMT. An example of a common semi-insulator is gallium arsenide. Some materials, such as titanium dioxide, can even be used as insulating materials for some applications, while being treated as wide-gap semiconductors for other applications.

=== Charge carriers (electrons and holes) ===
The partial filling of the states at the bottom of the conduction band can be understood as adding electrons to that band. The electrons do not stay indefinitely (due to the natural thermal recombination) but they can move around for some time. The actual concentration of electrons is typically very dilute, and so (unlike in metals) it is possible to think of the electrons in the conduction band of a semiconductor as a sort of classical ideal gas, where the electrons fly around freely without being subject to the Pauli exclusion principle. In most semiconductors, the conduction bands have a parabolic dispersion relation, and so these electrons respond to forces (electric field, magnetic field, etc.) much as they would in a vacuum, though with a different effective mass. Because the electrons behave like an ideal gas, one may also think about conduction in very simplistic terms such as the Drude model, and introduce concepts such as electron mobility.

For partial filling at the top of the valence band, it is helpful to introduce the concept of an electron hole. Although the electrons in the valence band are always moving around, a completely full valence band is inert, not conducting any current. If an electron is taken out of the valence band, then the trajectory that the electron would normally have taken is now missing its charge. For the purposes of electric current, this combination of the full valence band, minus the electron, can be converted into a picture of a completely empty band containing a positively charged particle that moves in the same way as the electron. Combined with the negative effective mass of the electrons at the top of the valence band, we arrive at a picture of a positively charged particle that responds to electric and magnetic fields just as a normal positively charged particle would do in a vacuum, again with some positive effective mass. This particle is called a hole, and the collection of holes in the valence band can again be understood in simple classical terms (as with the electrons in the conduction band).

==== Carrier generation and recombination ====
When ionizing radiation strikes a semiconductor, it may excite an electron out of its energy level and consequently leave a hole. This process is known as electron-hole pair generation. Electron-hole pairs are constantly generated from thermal energy as well, in the absence of any external energy source.

Electron-hole pairs are also apt to recombine. Conservation of energy demands that these recombination events, in which an electron loses an amount of energy larger than the band gap, be accompanied by the emission of thermal energy (in the form of phonons) or radiation (in the form of photons).

In some states, the generation and recombination of electron–hole pairs are in equipoise. The number of electron-hole pairs in the steady state at a given temperature is determined by quantum statistical mechanics. The precise quantum mechanical mechanisms of generation and recombination are governed by the conservation of energy and conservation of momentum.

As the probability that electrons and holes meet together is proportional to the product of their numbers, the product is in the steady-state nearly constant at a given temperature, providing that there is no significant electric field (which might "flush" carriers of both types, or move them from neighbor regions containing more of them to meet together) or externally driven pair generation. The product is a function of the temperature, as the probability of getting enough thermal energy to produce a pair increases with temperature, being approximately exp(−E_{G}/kT), where k is the Boltzmann constant, T is the absolute temperature and E_{G} is bandgap.

The probability of meeting is increased by carrier traps – impurities or dislocations which can trap an electron or hole and hold it until a pair is completed. Such carrier traps are sometimes purposely added to reduce the time needed to reach the steady-state.

=== Doping ===
Doping of a pure silicon array. Silicon based intrinsic semiconductor becomes extrinsic when impurities such as Boron and Antimony are introduced.

The conductivity of semiconductors may easily be modified by introducing impurities into their crystal lattice. The process of adding controlled impurities to a semiconductor is known as doping. The amount of impurity, or dopant, added to an intrinsic (pure) semiconductor varies its level of conductivity. Doped semiconductors are referred to as extrinsic. By adding impurity to the pure semiconductors, the electrical conductivity may be varied by factors of thousands or millions.

A 1 cm^{3} specimen of a metal or semiconductor has the order of 10^{22} atoms. In a metal, every atom donates at least one free electron for conduction, thus 1 cm^{3} of metal contains on the order of 10^{22} free electrons, whereas a 1 cm^{3} sample of pure germanium at 20 °C contains about 4.2×10^{22} atoms, but only 2.5×10^{13} free electrons and 2.5×10^{13} holes. The addition of 0.001% of arsenic (an impurity) donates an extra 10^{17} free electrons in the same volume and the electrical conductivity is increased by a factor of 10,000.

The materials chosen as suitable dopants depend on the atomic properties of both the dopant and the material to be doped. In general, dopants that produce the desired controlled changes are classified as either electron acceptors or donors. Semiconductors doped with donor impurities are called n-type, while those doped with acceptor impurities are known as p-type. The n and p type designations indicate which charge carrier acts as the material's majority carrier. The opposite carrier is called the minority carrier, which exists due to thermal excitation at a much lower concentration compared to the majority carrier.

For example, the pure semiconductor silicon has four valence electrons that bond each silicon atom to its neighbors. In silicon, the most common dopants are group III and group V elements. Group III elements all contain three valence electrons, causing them to function as acceptors when used to dope silicon. When an acceptor atom replaces a silicon atom in the crystal, a vacant state (an electron "hole") is created, which can move around the lattice and function as a charge carrier. Group V elements have five valence electrons, which allows them to act as a donor; substitution of these atoms for silicon creates an extra free electron. Therefore, a silicon crystal doped with boron creates a p-type semiconductor whereas one doped with phosphorus results in an n-type material.

During manufacture, dopants can be diffused into the semiconductor body by contact with gaseous compounds of the desired element, or ion implantation can be used to accurately position the doped regions.

=== Amorphous semiconductors ===
Some materials, when rapidly cooled to a glassy amorphous state, have semiconducting properties. These include B, Si, Ge, Se, and Te, and there are multiple theories to explain them.

== Early history of semiconductors ==
The history of the understanding of semiconductors begins with experiments on the electrical properties of materials. The properties of the time-temperature coefficient of resistance, rectification, and light-sensitivity were observed starting in the early 19th century.

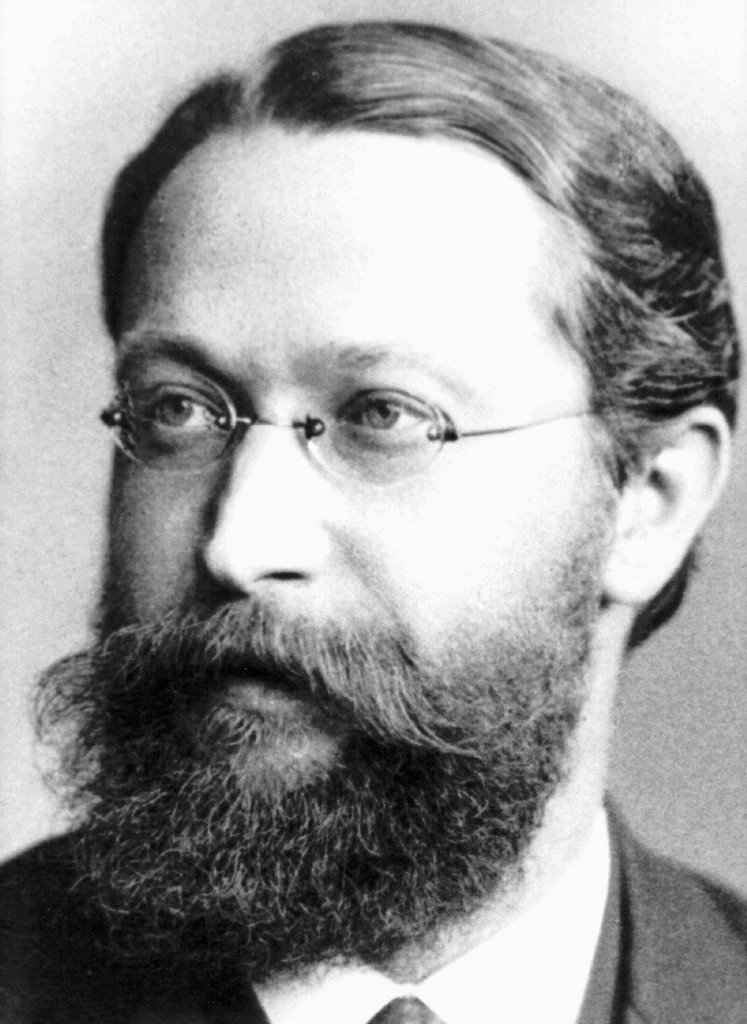
Karl Ferdinand Braun developed the crystal detector, the first semiconductor device, in 1874.

Thomas Johann Seebeck was the first to notice that semiconductors exhibit special feature such that experiment concerning an Seebeck effect emerged with much stronger result when applying semiconductors, in 1821. In 1833, Michael Faraday reported that the resistance of specimens of silver sulfide decreases when they are heated. This is contrary to the behavior of metallic substances such as copper. In 1839, Alexandre Edmond Becquerel reported observation of a voltage between a solid and a liquid electrolyte, when struck by light, the photovoltaic effect. In 1873, Willoughby Smith observed that selenium resistors exhibit decreasing resistance when light falls on them. In 1874, Karl Ferdinand Braun observed conduction and rectification in metallic sulfides, although this effect had been discovered earlier by Peter Munck af Rosenschöld (sv) writing for the Annalen der Physik und Chemie in 1835; Rosenschöld's findings were ignored. Simon Sze stated that Braun's research was the earliest systematic study of semiconductor devices. Also in 1874, Arthur Schuster found that a copper oxide layer on wires had rectification properties that ceased when the wires are cleaned. William Grylls Adams and Richard Evans Day observed the photovoltaic effect in selenium in 1876.

A unified explanation of these phenomena required a theory of solid-state physics, which developed greatly in the first half of the 20th century. In 1878 Edwin Herbert Hall demonstrated the deflection of flowing charge carriers by an applied magnetic field, the Hall effect. The discovery of the electron by J.J. Thomson in 1897 prompted theories of electron-based conduction in solids. Karl Baedeker, by observing a Hall effect with the reverse sign to that in metals, theorized that copper iodide had positive charge carriers. Johan Koenigsberger classified solid materials like metals, insulators, and "variable conductors" in 1914 although his student Josef Weiss already introduced the term Halbleiter (a semiconductor in modern meaning) in his Ph.D. thesis in 1910. Felix Bloch published a theory of the movement of electrons through atomic lattices in 1928. In 1930, Bernhard Gudden stated that conductivity in semiconductors was due to minor concentrations of impurities. By 1931, the band theory of conduction had been established by Alan Herries Wilson and the concept of band gaps had been developed. Walter H. Schottky and Nevill Francis Mott developed models of the potential barrier and of the characteristics of a metal–semiconductor junction. By 1938, Boris Davydov had developed a theory of the copper-oxide rectifier, identifying the effect of the p–n junction and the importance of minority carriers and surface states.

Agreement between theoretical predictions (based on developing quantum mechanics) and experimental results was sometimes poor. This was later explained by John Bardeen as due to the extreme "structure sensitive" behavior of semiconductors, whose properties change dramatically based on tiny amounts of impurities. Commercially pure materials of the 1920s containing varying proportions of trace contaminants produced differing experimental results. This spurred the development of improved material refining techniques, culminating in modern semiconductor refineries producing materials with parts-per-trillion purity.

Devices using semiconductors were at first constructed based on empirical knowledge before semiconductor theory provided a guide to the construction of more capable and reliable devices.

Alexander Graham Bell used the light-sensitive property of selenium to transmit sound over a beam of light in 1880. A working solar cell, of low efficiency, was constructed by Charles Fritts in 1883, using a metal plate coated with selenium and a thin layer of gold; the device became commercially useful in photographic light meters in the 1930s. Point-contact microwave detector rectifiers made of lead sulfide were used by Jagadish Chandra Bose in 1904; the cat's-whisker detector using natural galena or other materials became a common device in the development of radio. However, it was somewhat unpredictable in operation and required manual adjustment for best performance. In 1906, H.J. Round observed light emission when electric current passed through silicon carbide crystals, the principle behind the light-emitting diode. Oleg Losev observed similar light emission in 1922, but at the time the effect had no practical use. Power rectifiers, using copper oxide and selenium, were developed in the 1920s and became commercially important as an alternative to vacuum tube rectifiers.

The first semiconductor devices used galena, including German physicist Ferdinand Braun's crystal detector in 1874 and Indian physicist Jagadish Chandra Bose's radio crystal detector in 1901.

In the years preceding World War II, infrared detection and communications devices prompted research into lead-sulfide and lead-selenide materials. These devices were used for detecting ships and aircraft, for infrared rangefinders, and for voice communication systems. The point-contact crystal detector became vital for microwave radio systems since available vacuum tube devices could not serve as detectors above about 4000 MHz; advanced radar systems relied on the fast response of crystal detectors. Considerable research and development of silicon materials occurred during the war to develop detectors of consistent quality.

=== Early transistors ===
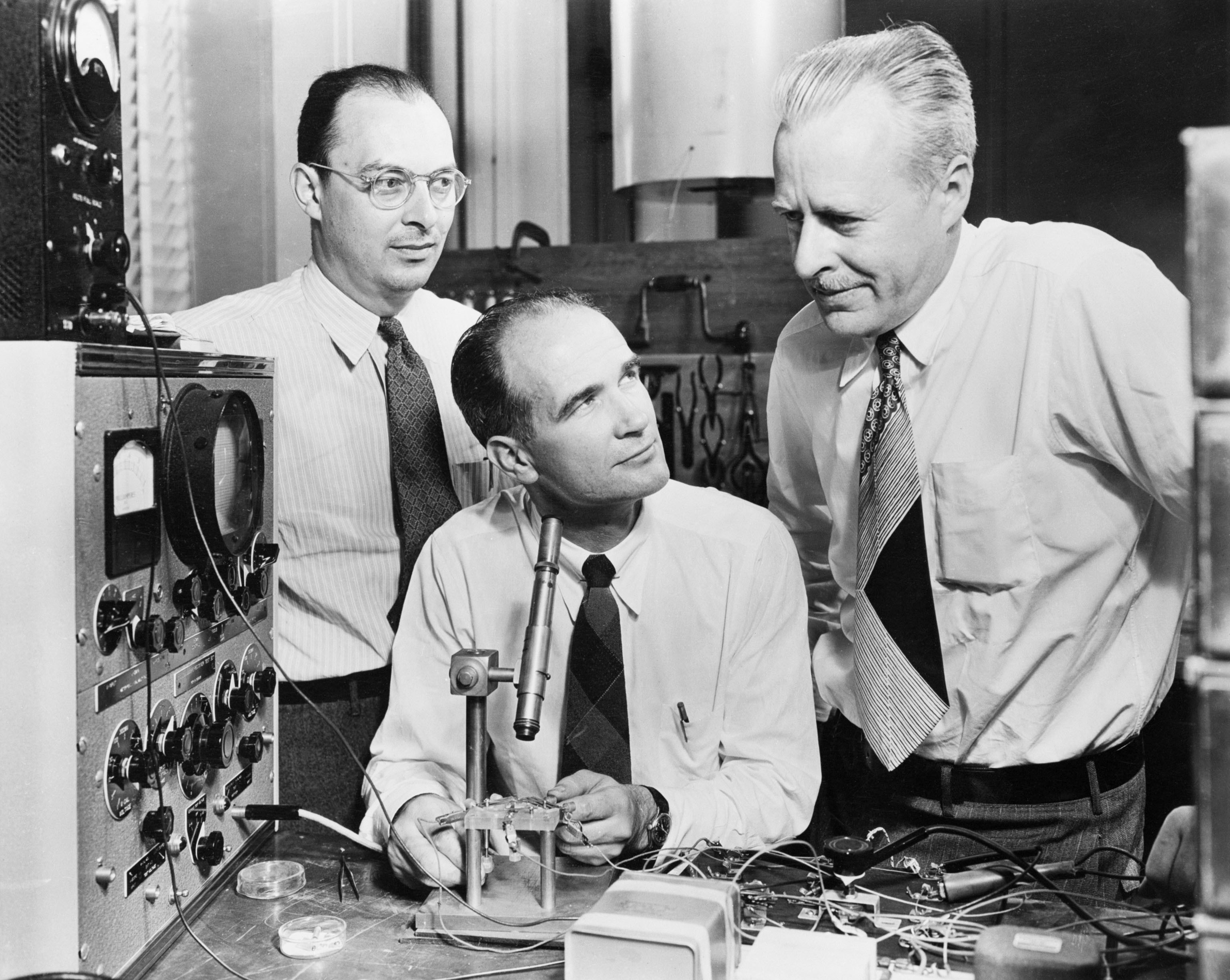
John Bardeen, William Shockley and Walter Brattain developed the bipolar point-contact transistor in 1947.

Detector and power rectifiers could not amplify a signal. Many efforts were made to develop a solid-state amplifier and were successful in developing a device called the point contact transistor which could amplify 20 dB or more. In 1922, Oleg Losev developed two-terminal, negative resistance amplifiers for radio, but he died in the Siege of Leningrad after successful completion. In 1926, Julius Edgar Lilienfeld patented a device resembling a field-effect transistor, but it was not practical. Rudolf Hilsch and R. W. Pohl in 1938 demonstrated a solid-state amplifier using a structure resembling the control grid of a vacuum tube; although the device displayed power gain, it had a cut-off frequency of one cycle per second, too low for any practical applications, but an effective application of the available theory. At Bell Labs, William Shockley and A. Holden started investigating solid-state amplifiers in 1938. The first p–n junction in silicon was observed by Russell Ohl about 1941 when a specimen was found to be light-sensitive, with a sharp boundary between p-type impurity at one end and n-type at the other. A slice cut from the specimen at the p–n boundary developed a voltage when exposed to light.

The first working transistor was a point-contact transistor invented by John Bardeen, Walter Houser Brattain, and William Shockley at Bell Labs in 1947. Shockley had earlier theorized a field-effect amplifier made from germanium and silicon, but he failed to build such a working device, before eventually using germanium to invent the point-contact transistor. In France, during the war, Herbert Mataré had observed amplification between adjacent point contacts on a germanium base. After the war, Mataré's group announced their "Transistron" amplifier only shortly after Bell Labs announced the "transistor".

In 1954, physical chemist Morris Tanenbaum fabricated the first silicon junction transistor at Bell Labs. However, early junction transistors were relatively bulky devices that were difficult to manufacture on a mass-production basis, which limited them to a number of specialised applications.

== See also ==
- Deathnium
- List of semiconductor occupations
- Outline of semiconductors
- Semiconductor device fabrication
- Semiconductor industry
- Semiconductor characterization techniques
- Transistor count
