= Volker Heine =

New Zealand scientist

Volker Heine FRS
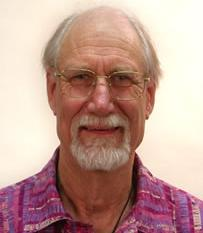
- Heine in 2012
- Born: 19 September 1930 (age 95); Hamburg, Germany
- Education: University of Otago; University of Cambridge
- Awards: Maxwell Medal and Prize (1972); Royal Medal (1993); IOP Dirac Medal (1994); Max Born Prize (2001)
- Scientific career
- Fields: Condensed matter physics, materials science
- Workplaces: University of Cambridge
- Doctoral advisor: Sir Nevill Mott
- Doctoral students: John Pendry

Volker Heine FRS (born 19 September 1930) is a German-born New Zealand and British physicist who is a Professor Emeritus at University of Cambridge. He is considered a pioneer of theoretical and computational studies of the electronic structure of solids and liquids and the determination of physical properties derived from it.

== Biography ==
Born in Hamburg, Germany, Volker Heine was educated at Wanganui Collegiate School and the University of Otago (New Zealand). In 1954, he came to University of Cambridge on a Shell Post-Graduate Scholarship to do his Ph.D. in physics (1956) as student of Sir Nevill Mott. In the following years he obtained a Fellowship at Clare College and became part of the new theory group in the Cavendish Laboratory and apart from a post-doc year and several sabbaticals and summer visits in the US, he stayed in Cambridge for the remainder of his career. In 1976, Heine became a professor and took over as head of the theory group which was by then called "Theory of Condensed Matter". He held that position until his retirement in 1997.

Volker Heine has been a very active figure in the international scientific community, shaping in particular the landscape of the field of atomistic computer simulations in Europe. He initiated and later led the Psi-k network, a worldwide network of researchers working on the advancement of first-principles computational materials science. Psi-k's mission is to develop fundamental theory, algorithms, and computer codes in order to understand, predict, and design materials properties and functions. Key activities of Psi-k are the organization of conferences, workshops, tutorials and training schools as well as the dissemination of scientific thinking in society.

Volker Heine was elected Fellow of the Royal Society in 1974 and of the American Physical Society in 1987. He was awarded the Maxwell Medal and Prize in 1972, the Royal Medal of the Royal Society (London) in 1993, the Dirac Medal of the Institute of Physics in 1994, and the Max Born Prize in 2001. He has been visiting professor at several universities around the world and External Scientific Member of the Max Planck Institute for Solid State Research in Stuttgart.

Heine is married to Daphne Heine with three children.

== Research ==
Volker Heine's research essentially covered three areas: (a) Understanding the behavior of materials from the calculation of their electronic structure; (b) Understanding the origin of incommensurately modulated materials; (c) Understanding the structure and properties of minerals from an atomic point of view. His main research topic is electronic structure theory and particularly the development of various fundamental concepts for condensed matter physics. Here, his pioneering work on pseudopotentials forms a basis of most presently undertaken electronic structure and total-energy calculations, in particular for semiconductors and so-called sp-bonded metals. He also developed the basic description of electron-phonon coupling, and much of our understanding of the structure and atomic relaxation at surfaces was established by Heine. Furthermore, his groundbreaking work on the complex band structure and pioneering ideas in the theory of surface states provides the basis of present-day description and understanding of electronic properties of bulk and interfaces. This includes the concept of metal-induced gap states at metal-semiconductor heterostructures and the understanding of Schottky barriers. Amongst his seminal contributions are also the formulation of a recursion method for electronic structure studies, a theory of incommensurate structures of polytypes of silicon carbide, and a model for incommensurate and framework structures of minerals. He studied magnetic properties of solids, various aspects of crystal phase transitions e.g. and thermal expansion and more. Volker Heine has published more than 200 research papers, several review articles and one text book.
