= Carbon nanotube transistor =

Carbon nanotube transistor could refer to:

- Carbon nanotube field-effect transistor
- tunnel diode made from a carbon nanotube
