= Walter Schottky =

German physicist and electrical engineer (1886-1976)

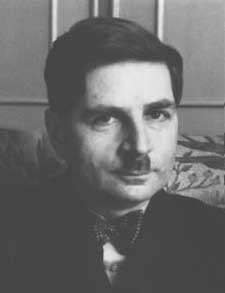
- Schottky, c. 1920
- Born: 23 July 1886; Zurich, Switzerland
- Died: 4 March 1976 (aged 89); Pretzfeld, Bavaria, West Germany
- Education: University of Berlin (Dr. phil.)
- Known for: Schottky anomaly; Schottky barrier; Schottky defect; Schottky diode; Schottky effect; Mott–Schottky equation; Screen-grid valve; Ribbon microphone
- Father: Friedrich Schottky
- Awards: Hughes Medal (1936); Werner von Siemens Ring (1964)
- Scientific career
- Fields: Physics; electrical engineering
- Workplaces: Siemens & Halske; University of Wuerzburg; University of Rostock; Siemens-Schuckert
- Thesis: Zur relativtheoretischen Energetik und Dynamik (1912)
- Doctoral advisor: Max Planck
- Other academic advisors: Heinrich Rubens

Walter Schottky (German: [ˈvaltɐ ˈʃɔtki]; 23 July 1886 – 4 March 1976) was a German physicist and electrical engineer who played a major early role in developing the theory of thermionic emission, invented the screen-grid vacuum tube in 1915, co-invented the ribbon microphone and ribbon loudspeaker along with Erwin Gerlach in 1924, and later made many significant contributions in the areas of semiconductor devices, technical physics, and technology.

The Schottky effect (a thermionic emission; important for vacuum tube technology), the Schottky diode (where the depletion layer occurring in it is called the Schottky barrier), the Schottky vacancies (or Schottky defects), the Schottky anomaly (a peak value of the heat capacity), and the Mott–Schottky equation (also Langmuir–Schottky space charge law) are named after him. He conducted research on electrical noise mechanisms (shot noise), space charge, especially in electron tubes, and the barrier layer in semiconductors, which were important for the development of copper oxide rectifiers and transistors.

== Biography ==
Walter Schottky was born on 23 July 1886 in Zurich, Switzerland, the son of mathematician Friedrich Schottky, who had been appointed a professor at the University of Zurich in 1882. The family moved back to Germany in 1892, where his father took up an appointment at the University of Marburg.

In 1904, Schottky graduated from Steglitz-Gymnasium in Berlin. He studied under Max Planck and Heinrich Rubens at the University of Berlin, where he received his Ph.D. in 1912 with a thesis titled Zur relativtheoretischen Energetik und Dynamik (On Relativistic Energetics and Dynamics).

In 1912, Schottky began his postdoctoral studies at the University of Jena. In 1914, he joined the low-current laboratory of Siemens & Halske in Berlin. He then lectured at the University of Wuerzburg from 1919 to 1922, receiving his habilitation in 1920. He was Professor of Theoretical Physics at the University of Rostock from 1923 to 1927, when he returned to Siemens & Halske. In 1943, due to the Second World War, Schottky moved from Berlin to Pretzfeld, where he worked in a semiconductor laboratory of Siemens-Schuckert. He also worked in Erlangen from 1955 to 1958.

== Inventions ==
The invention of superheterodyne is usually attributed to Edwin Armstrong. However, Schottky published an article in the Proceedings of the IEEE that may indicate he had invented and patented something similar in Germany in 1918. The Frenchman Lucien Lévy had filed a claim earlier than either Armstrong or Schottky, and eventually his patent was recognized in the US and Germany.

In 1924, Schottky co-invented the ribbon microphone along with Erwin Gerlach. The idea was that a very fine ribbon suspended in a magnetic field could generate electric signals. This led to the invention of the ribbon loudspeaker by using it in the reverse order, but it was not practical until high flux permanent magnets became available in the late 1930s.

== Theories ==
In 1914, Schottky developed the well-known classical formula:

$$E_{\rm int}(x) = -\frac{q^2} {16\pi\epsilon_0{x}}$$.

This computes the interaction energy between a point charge q and a flat metal surface, when the charge is at a distance x from the surface. Owing to the method of its derivation, this interaction is called the "image potential energy" (image PE). Schottky based his work on earlier work by Lord Kelvin relating to the image PE for a sphere. Schottky's image PE has become a standard component in simple models of the barrier to motion, M(x), experienced by an electron on approaching a metal surface or a metal–semiconductor interface from the inside. (This M(x) is the quantity that appears when the one-dimensional, one-particle, Schrödinger equation is written in the form

$$\frac{d^2}{dx^2} \Psi(x) = \frac{2m}{\hbar^2} M(x) \Psi(x) .$$

( $\hbar$ is the reduced Planck constant, and m is the electron mass.)

The image PE is usually combined with terms relating to an applied electric field F and to the height h (in the absence of any field) of the barrier. This leads to the following expression for the dependence of the barrier energy on distance x, measured from the "electrical surface" of the metal, into the vacuum or into the semiconductor:

$$M(x) = \; h -eFx - e^2/4 \pi \epsilon_0 \epsilon_r x \;.$$

Here, e is the elementary positive charge, ε_{0} is the electric constant and ε_{r} is the relative permittivity of the second medium (=1 for vacuum). In the case of a metal–semiconductor junction, this is called a Schottky barrier; in the case of the metal-vacuum interface, this is sometimes called a Schottky–Nordheim barrier. In many contexts, h has to be taken equal to the local work function φ.

This Schottky–Nordheim barrier (SN barrier) has played an important role in the theories of thermionic emission and of field electron emission. Applying the field causes lowering of the barrier, and thus enhances the emission current in thermionic emission. This is called the "Schottky effect", and the resulting emission regime is called "Schottky emission".

In 1923, Schottky suggested (incorrectly) that the experimental phenomenon then called autoelectronic emission and now called field electron emission resulted when the barrier was pulled down to zero. In fact, the effect is due to wave-mechanical tunneling, as shown by Fowler and Nordheim in 1928. But the SN barrier has now become the standard model for the tunneling barrier.

Later, in the context of semiconductor devices, it was suggested that a similar barrier should exist at the junction of a metal and a semiconductor. Such barriers are now widely known as Schottky barriers, and considerations apply to the transfer of electrons across them that are analogous to the older considerations of how electrons are emitted from a metal into vacuum. (Basically, several emission regimes exist, for different combinations of field and temperature. The different regimes are governed by different approximate formulae.)

When the whole behaviour of such interfaces is examined, it is found that they can act (asymmetrically) as a special form of electronic diode, now called a Schottky diode. In this context, the metal–semiconductor junction is known as a "Schottky (rectifying) contact".

== Awards ==
Country	Year	Institute	Award	Citation	Ref.
United Kingdom	1936	Royal Society	Hughes Medal	"For his discovery of the schrot effect in thermionic emission, and for his invention of the screen-grid tetrode and a superheterodyne method of receiving wireless signals"	
West Germany	1964		Werner von Siemens Ring		

== Commemorations ==
The Walter Schottky Institute for semiconductor research and the Walter Schottky Prize for outstanding achievements in solid-state physics are named after him.

The Walter Schottky House of the RWTH Aachen University and the Walter Schottky Building of the Georg-Simon-Ohm-Hochschule Nürnberg of Applied Sciences in Nuremberg are also named after him. The Fraunhofer Institute for Integrated Systems and Device Technology is located on Schottkystraße in Erlangen.

== Books ==
- Thermodynamik, Julius Springer, Berlin, Germany, 1929.
- Physik der Glühelektroden, Akademische Verlagsgesellschaft, Leipzig, 1928.

== See also ==
- Schottky transistor
- Schottky junction solar cell
- Surface-barrier transistor
