= Bardeen =

Bardeen is a surname that is primarily found in the United States. Notable people with the surname include:

- Charles Russell Bardeen (1871–1935), American anatomist, first dean of the medical school of the University of Wisconsin-Madison
- Charles V. Bardeen (1850–1903), American jurist
- Charles William Bardeen (1847–1924), American educator
- George Bardeen (1850–1924), American businessman and politician from Michigan
- James M. Bardeen (1939–2022), American physicist
- John Bardeen (1908–1991), American physicist and electrical engineer; co-inventor of the transistor; twice Nobel Prize winner
- William A. Bardeen (1941–2025), American theoretical physicist, son of John Bardeen
