= MESFET =

Type of field-effect transistor

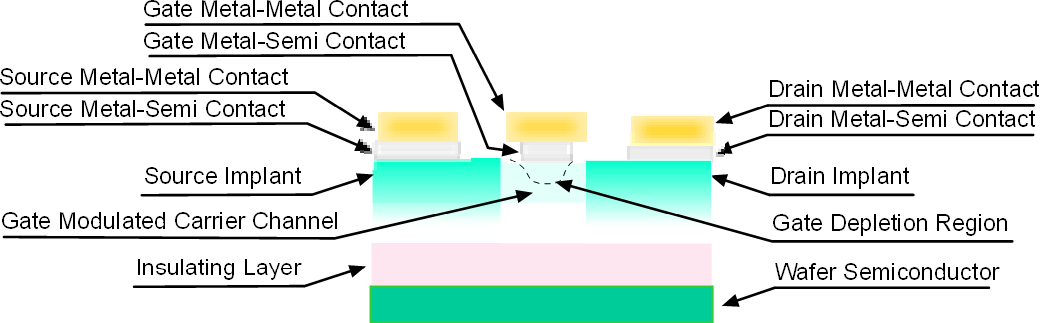
MESFET schematic

A MESFET (metal–semiconductor field-effect transistor) is a field-effect transistor semiconductor device similar to a JFET with a Schottky (metal–semiconductor) junction instead of a p–n junction for a gate.

== Construction ==
MESFETs are constructed in compound semiconductor technologies lacking high quality surface passivation, such as gallium arsenide, indium phosphide, or silicon carbide, and are faster but more expensive than silicon-based JFETs or MOSFETs. Production MESFETs are operated up to approximately 45 GHz, and are commonly used for microwave frequency communications and radar. The first MESFETs were developed in 1966, and a year later their extremely high frequency RF microwave performance was demonstrated.

== Functional architecture ==
The MESFET, similarly to JFET, differs from the common insulated gate FET or MOSFET because there is no insulator under the gate over the active switching region. This implies that the MESFET gate should, in transistor mode, be biased such that one has a reversed-biased depletion zone controlling the underlying channel, rather than a forward-conducting metal-semiconductor diode to the channel.

While this restriction inhibits certain circuit possibilities as the gate must remain reverse-biased and cannot, therefore, exceed a certain voltage of forward bias, MESFETs analog and digital devices work reasonably well if kept within the confines of design limits. The most critical aspect of the design is the gate metal extent over the switching region. Generally, the narrower the gate modulated carrier channel, the better the frequency handling abilities. Spacing of the source and drain concerning the gate, and the lateral extent of the gate are important though somewhat less critical design parameters. MESFET current handling ability improves as the gate is elongated laterally, keeping the active region constant, however, phase shift along the gate is limited due to the transmission line effect. As a result, most production MESFETs use a built-up top layer of low-resistance metal on the gate, often producing a mushroom-like profile in cross-section.

== Applications ==
Numerous MESFET fabrication possibilities have been explored for a wide variety of semiconductor systems. Some of the main application areas are military communications, as front end low noise amplifier of microwave receivers in both military radar devices and communication, commercial optoelectronics, satellite communication, as a power amplifier for the output stage of microwave links, and as a power oscillator.

== See also ==
- High electron mobility transistor (HEMT)
- Heterojunction bipolar transistor
