= Electrostatic force microscope =

Type of microscope

Electrostatic force microscopy (EFM) is a type of dynamic non-contact atomic force microscopy where the electrostatic force is probed. ("Dynamic" here means that the cantilever is oscillating and does not make contact with the sample). This force arises due to the attraction or repulsion of separated charges. It is a long-range force and can be detected 100 nm or more from the sample.

== Force measurement ==
For example, consider a conductive cantilever tip and sample which are separated a distance z usually by a vacuum. A bias voltage between tip and sample is applied by an external battery forming a capacitor, C, between the two. The capacitance of the system depends on the geometry of the tip and sample. The total energy stored in that capacitor is
$$U = \frac{1}{2} \, C \, \Delta V^2.$$
The work done by the battery to maintain a constant voltage, ΔV, between the capacitor plates (tip and sample) is −2U. By definition, taking the negative gradient of the total energy U_{total} = −U gives the force. The z component of the force (the force along the axis connecting the tip and sample) is thus:
$$F_{\rm electrostatic} = \frac{1}{2} \frac{\partial C}{\partial z} \Delta V^2 .$$
Since ∂C/∂z < 0 this force is always attractive. The electrostatic force can be probed by changing the voltage, and that force is parabolic with respect to the voltage. One note to make is that ΔV is not simply the voltage difference between the tip and sample. Since the tip and sample are often not the same material, and furthermore can be subject to trapped charges, debris, etc., there is a difference between the work functions of the two. This difference, when expressed in terms of a voltage, is called the contact potential difference, V_{CPD}. This causes the apex of the parabola to rest at
$$\Delta V = V_{\rm tip} - V_{\rm sample} - V_{\rm CPD} = 0.$$
Typically, the value of V_{CPD} is on the order of a few hundred millivolts. Forces as small as piconewtons can routinely be detected with this method.

== Non-contact atomic force microscopy ==
A common form of electric force microscopy involves a noncontact AFM mode of operation. In this mode the cantilever is oscillated at a resonant frequency of the cantilever and the AFM tip is held such that it only senses with long range electrostatic forces without entering the repulsive contact regime. In this non-contact regime, the electric force gradient causes a shift in the resonance frequency of the cantilever. EFM images can be created by measuring the cantilever oscillation, phase and/or frequency shift of the cantilever in response to the electrostatic force gradient.

== Immersion ==
With an electrostatic force microscope, like the atomic force microscope it is based on, the sample can be immersed in non-conductive liquid only, because conductive liquids hinder the establishment of an electrical potential difference that causes the detected electrostatic force.

== See also ==
- Kelvin probe force microscopy – a scanning probe microscopy technique very similar to EFM, except with emphasis on the measurement of V_{CPD}.
- Magnetic force microscopy – a related and similar technique that measures magnetic force gradients instead of electrostatic force gradients.
