= Scanning quantum dot microscopy =

Scanning quantum dot microscopy (SQDM) is a scanning probe microscopy (SPM) that is used to image nanoscale electric potential distributions on surfaces. The method quantifies surface potential variations via their influence on the potential of a quantum dot (QD) attached to the apex of the scanned probe. SQDM allows, for example, the quantification of surface dipoles originating from individual adatoms, molecules, or nanostructures. This gives insights into surface and interface mechanisms such as reconstruction or relaxation, mechanical distortion, charge transfer and chemical interaction. Measuring electric potential distributions is also relevant for characterizing organic and inorganic semiconductor devices which feature electric dipole layers at the relevant interfaces. The probe to surface distance in SQDM ranges from 2 nm to 10 nm and therefore allows imaging on non-planar surfaces or, e.g., of biomolecules with a distinct 3D structure. Related imaging techniques are Kelvin Probe Force Microscopy (KPFM) and Electrostatic Force Microscopy (EFM).

== Working principle ==
In SQDM, the relation between the potential at the QD and the surface potential (the quantity of interest) is described by a boundary value problem of electrostatics. The boundary $\mathcal{S}$ is given by the surfaces of sample and probe assumed to be connected at infinity. Then, the potential $\Phi_\text{QD} = \Phi(\mathbf{r})$ of a point-like QD at $\mathbf{r}$ can be expressed using the Green's function formalism as a sum over volume and surface integrals, where $\mathcal{V}$ denotes the volume enclosed by $\mathcal{S}$ and $\mathbf{n}'$ is the surface normal.

$$\Phi_\text{QD} = \Phi(\mathbf{r})=\iiint\limits_\mathcal{V} G(\mathbf{r}, \mathbf{r}') \frac{\rho(\mathbf{r}')}{e}d^3\mathbf{r}'+ \frac{\epsilon_0}{e}\oint\limits_\mathcal{S} \bigg[G(\mathbf{r}, \mathbf{r}')\frac{\partial\Phi(\mathbf{r}')}{\partial \mathbf{n}'}-\Phi(\mathbf{r}')\frac{\partial G(\mathbf{r}, \mathbf{r}') }{\partial \mathbf{n}'}\bigg]d^2\mathbf{r}'.$$

In this expression, $\Phi_\text{QD}$ depends on the charge density $\rho$ inside $\mathcal{V}$ and on the potential $\Phi$ on $\mathcal{S}$ weighted by the Green's function

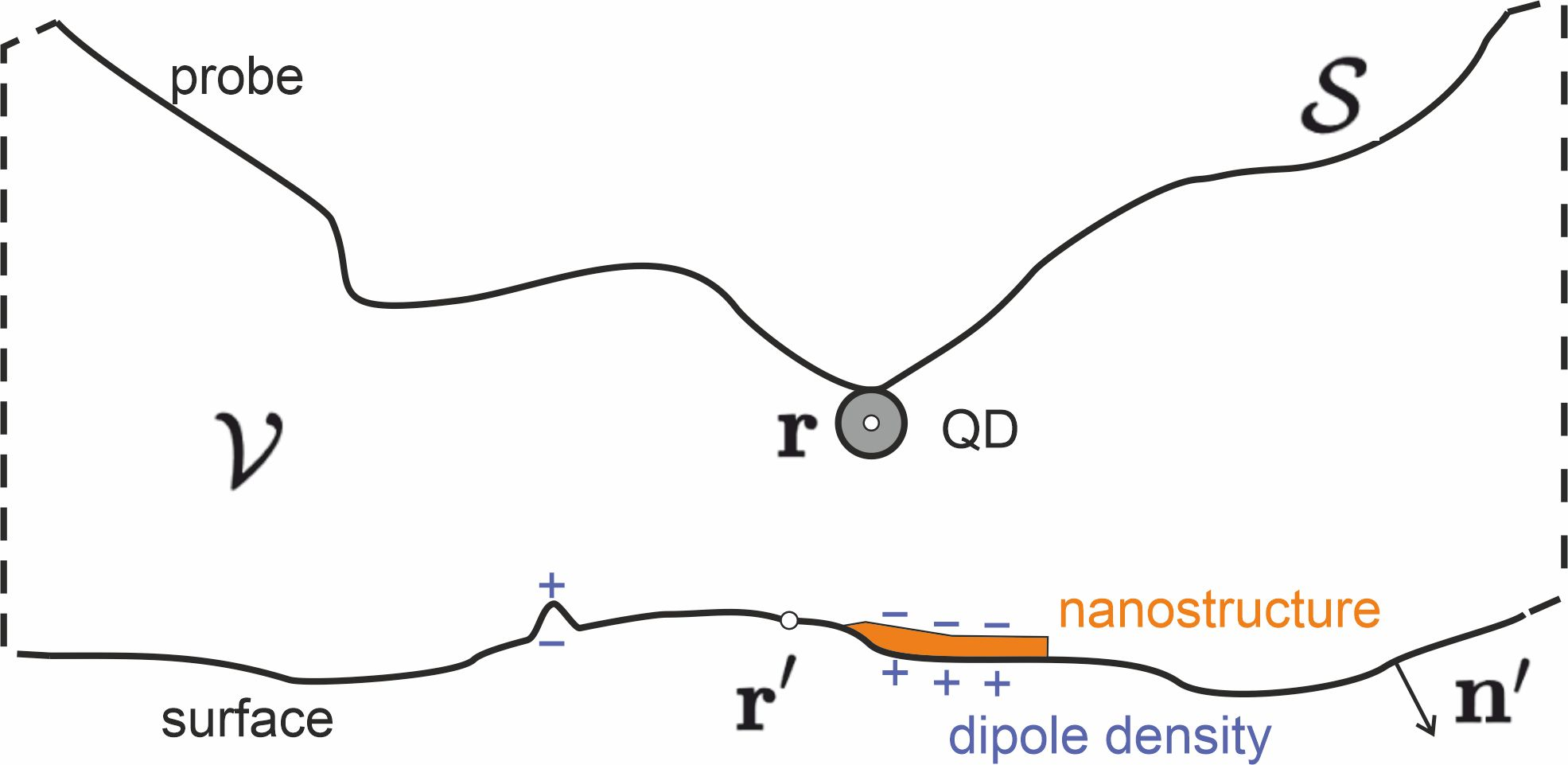
The relation between the QD potential at r and the surface potential at r' is described by a boundary value problem of electrostatics.

$$G(\mathbf{r},\mathbf{r}')=\frac{e}{4\pi\epsilon_0|\mathbf{r}-\mathbf{r}'|} + F(\mathbf{r},\mathbf{r}'),$$

where $F$ satisfies the Laplace equation.

By specifying $F$ and thus defining the boundary conditions, these equations can be used to obtain the relation between $\Phi_\text{QD}$ and the surface potential $\Phi_\text{s}(\mathbf{r}'), \quad \mathbf{r}' \in \mathcal{S}$ for more specific measurement situations. The combination of a conductive probe and a conductive surface, a situation characterized by Dirichlet boundary conditions, has been described in detail.

Conceptually, the relation between $\Phi_\text{QD}(\mathbf{r})$ and $\Phi_\text{s}(\mathbf{r}')$ links data in the imaging plane, obtained by reading out the QD potential, to data in the object surface - the surface potential. If the sample surface is approximated as locally flat and the relation between $\Phi_\text{QD}(\mathbf{r})$ and $\Phi_\text{s}(\mathbf{r}')$ therefore translationally invariant, the recovery of the object surface information from the imaging plane information is a deconvolution with a point spread function defined by the boundary value problem. In the specific case of a conductive boundary, the mutual screening of surface potentials by tip and surface lead to an exponential drop-off of the point spread function. This causes the exceptionally high lateral resolution of SQDM at large tip-surface separations compared to, for example, KPFM.

== Practical implementation ==
Two methods have been reported to obtain the imaging plane information, i.e., the variations in the QD potential $\Phi_\text{QD}(\mathbf{r})$ as the probe is scanned over the surface. In the compensation technique, $\Phi_\text{QD}$ is held at a constant value $\Phi_\text{QD}^0$. The influence of the laterally varying surface potentials on $\Phi_\text{QD}$ is actively compensated by continuously adjusting the global sample potential via an external bias voltage $V_\text{b}$. $\Phi_\text{QD}^0$ is chosen such that it matches a discrete transition of the QD charge state and the corresponding change in probe-sample force is used in non-contact atomic force microscopy to verify a correct compensation.

In an alternative method, the vertical component of the electric field at the QD position is mapped by measuring the energy shift of a specific optical transition of the QD which occurs due to the Stark effect. This method requires an additional optical setup in addition to the SPM setup.

The object plane image $\Phi_\text{s}(\mathbf{r}')$ can be interpreted as a variation of the work function, the surface potential, or the surface dipole density. The equivalence of these quantities is given by the Helmholtz equation. Within the surface dipole density interpretation, surface dipoles of individual nanostructures can be obtained by integration over a sufficiently large surface area.

== Topographic information from SQDM ==
In the compensation technique, the influence of the global sample potential $V_\text{b}$ on $\Phi_\text{QD}$ depends on the shape of the sample surface in a way that is defined by the corresponding boundary value problem. On a non-planar surface, changes in $\Phi_\text{QD}$ can therefore not uniquely be assigned to either a change in surface potential or in surface topography $t_\text{d}$ if only a single charge state transition is tracked. For example, a protrusion in the surface affects the QD potential since the gating by $V_\text{b}$ works more efficiently if the QD is placed above the protrusion. If two transitions are used in the compensation technique the contributions of surface topography $t_\text{d}$ and potential $\Phi_\text{s}$ can be disentangled and both quantities can be obtained unambiguously. The topographic information obtained via the compensation technique is an effective dielectric topography of metallic nature which is defined by the geometric topography and the dielectric properties of the sample surface or of a nanostructure.
