= Laser induced white emission =

Broadband light in the visible spectral range

Laser-induced white emission (LIWE) is a broadband light in the visible spectral range. This phenomenon was reported for the first time by Jiwei Wang and Peter Tanner in 2010 for fully concentrated lanthanide oxides in vacuum, excited by a focused beam of infrared laser diode operating in continuous wave (CW) mode. The white light emission intensity is exponentially dependent on excitation power density and pressure surrounding the samples. It was found that light emission is assisted by photocurrent generation and hot electron emission.

== Outline ==
In 2010, Tanner and Wang demonstrated an innovative method of white light generation from lanthanide materials located in strictly defined conditions, by exciting them with a concentrated beam from an infrared (IR) laser diode. Most importantly, this emission is characterized by a wide band covering the entire visible range, in contrast to light sources known so far, which generate white light by mixing several spectral lines. The discovery was interesting enough to attract the attention of many research groups around the world. Intensive work has begun to explore the mechanism responsible for generating this type of emission. As a result, the number of scientific publications on broadband white luminescence has been steadily increasing since 2010.

== Materials capable of LIWE generation ==
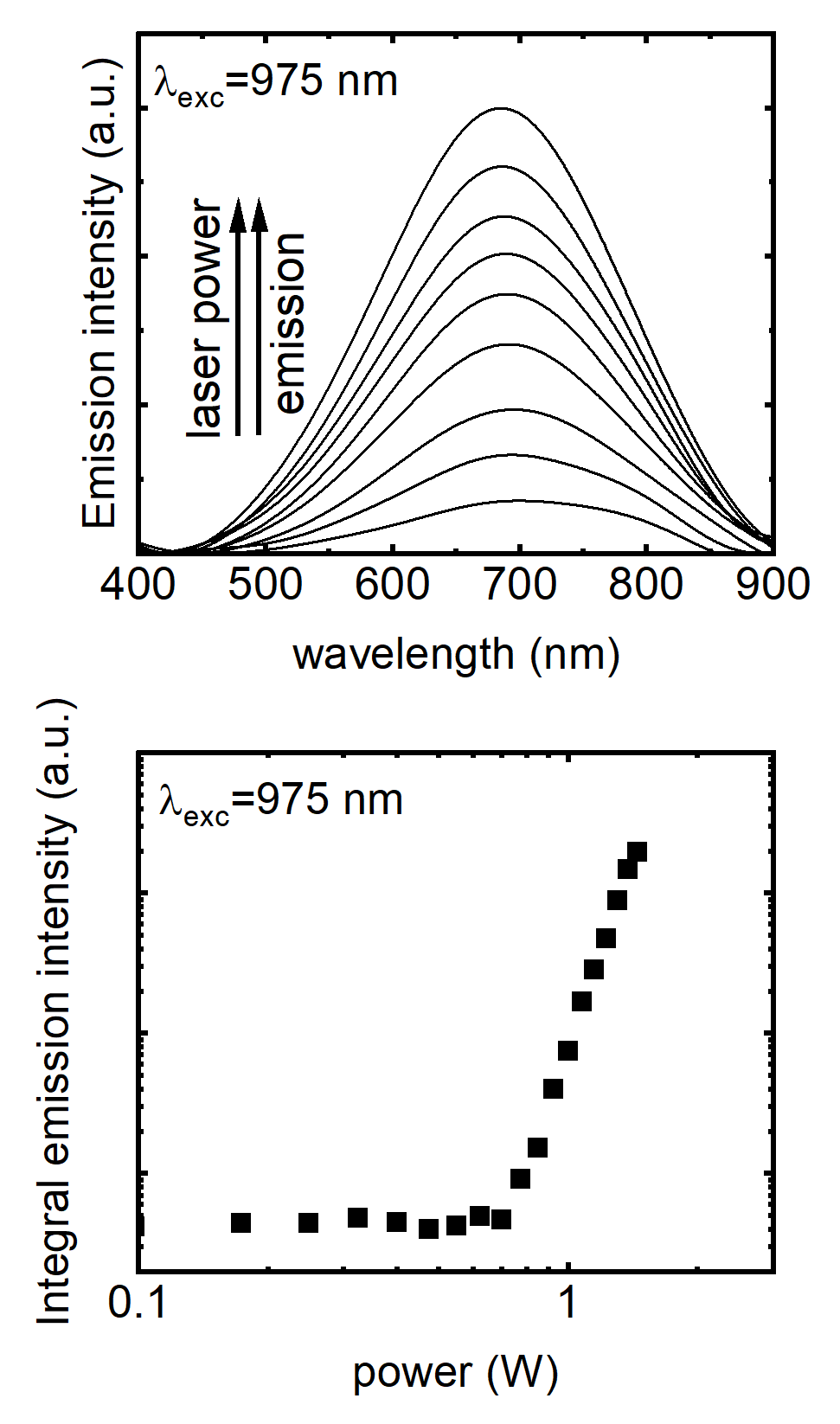
Figure 1. Power dependence of LIWE upon IR excitation.

The broadband, laser-induced white emission was reported in a number of different materials. Most common are inorganic hosts. These may be:

- fully doped (Er_{2}O_{3}, LiYbP_{4}O_{12}, LiYbF_{4}, NdAlO_{3}, PrO_{2});
- partially doped (Y_{2}O_{3}:Nd^{3+}, Yb^{3+}:Y_{2}Si_{2}O_{7}, Y_{4}Zr_{3}O_{12}:Yb^{3+}, ZrO_{2}:Yb^{3+}, ZnSe:Yb, Gd_{2}O_{3}:Yb^{3+}, YVO_{4}:Yb^{3+},Er^{3+}, Eu^{3+}:Sr_{2}CeO_{4}, Yb^{3+}:YAG);
- or not doped (Y_{2}O_{3}, Al_{2}O_{3}, GaN, Y_{2}Si_{2}O_{7}.)

with lanthanide or transition (Cr^{3+}:Y_{3}A_{5}O_{12}, CaCuSiO_{4}O_{10}, Gd_{3}Ga_{5}O_{12}:Cr^{3+}) metal ions.

There are also reports in the literature considering oxide matrices containing gold (Nd_{2}O_{3}/Au, Yb_{2}O_{3}/Au ) or silver (Ag-SiO_{2}-Er_{2}O_{3}) in their structure. Carbon-based materials (graphene ceramics, graphene foam, μ-diamonds) or other organic ([(RMSn)(PhSn)_{3}S_{6}] with RM = [(Et_{3}P)_{3}Ag],[(Me_{3}P)_{3}Au], [(RSn)_{4}S_{6}] with R = 4-(CH_{2}=CH)–C_{6}H_{4}) complexes undoped and doped with lanthanide ions ([YbL_{3}]_{0.7}[TbL_{3}]_{0.3} with L = pentafluorophenyl) are another relevant group of compounds. All of these materials exhibit very intense warm white light in a range of 400-800 nm.

== Impact of excitation power ==
The LIWE generation process is non-linear and strongly depends on the excitation power density. An increase in population power density (P) leads to a slight increase in white emission intensity (I) until a certain excitation threshold value is reached. Then, the increase in LIWE intensity is drastic (see Fig. 1). The dependence of intensity on power is described by the formula: I ∝ P^{N}, where N is the number of near infrared photons absorbed for LIWE generation. The characteristics of power dependence is not always the same and may vary depending on the tested material. In the literature some papers can be found where the increase in intensity is reported and is supported by two thresholds. The emission intensity increases to a certain value of pumping power, then decreases, then increases again. According to author of this publication, it could be related with regular anti-Stokes photoluminescence, heat collection and LIWE generation, respectively. Sometimes such behavior may be caused by the presence of lanthanide ions in the investigated host due to their effective absorption of radiation used to generate LIWE. It is worth to notice that the parameter N depends on the excitation wavelength.

== Impact of ambient pressure ==
The atmospheric pressure strongly influences the LIWE intensity. Usually, under reduced pressure conditions the intensity of white luminescence is very high due to the fact that the sample temperature is increased as a result of irradiation with a concentrated beam of the IR laser diode. The increase in pressure causes the intensity (I_{0}) is constant up to the threshold above which there is a sharp reduction in LIWE (see Fig. 2). Depending on the tested material, its luminescence may be completely quenched at atmospheric pressure. Such behavior is well described by heat dissipation model according to following formula: I_{em} = I_{0}∙exp(-p/p_{0}), where p_{0} is a critical magnitude of ambient pressure above which the luminescence intensity decreases.

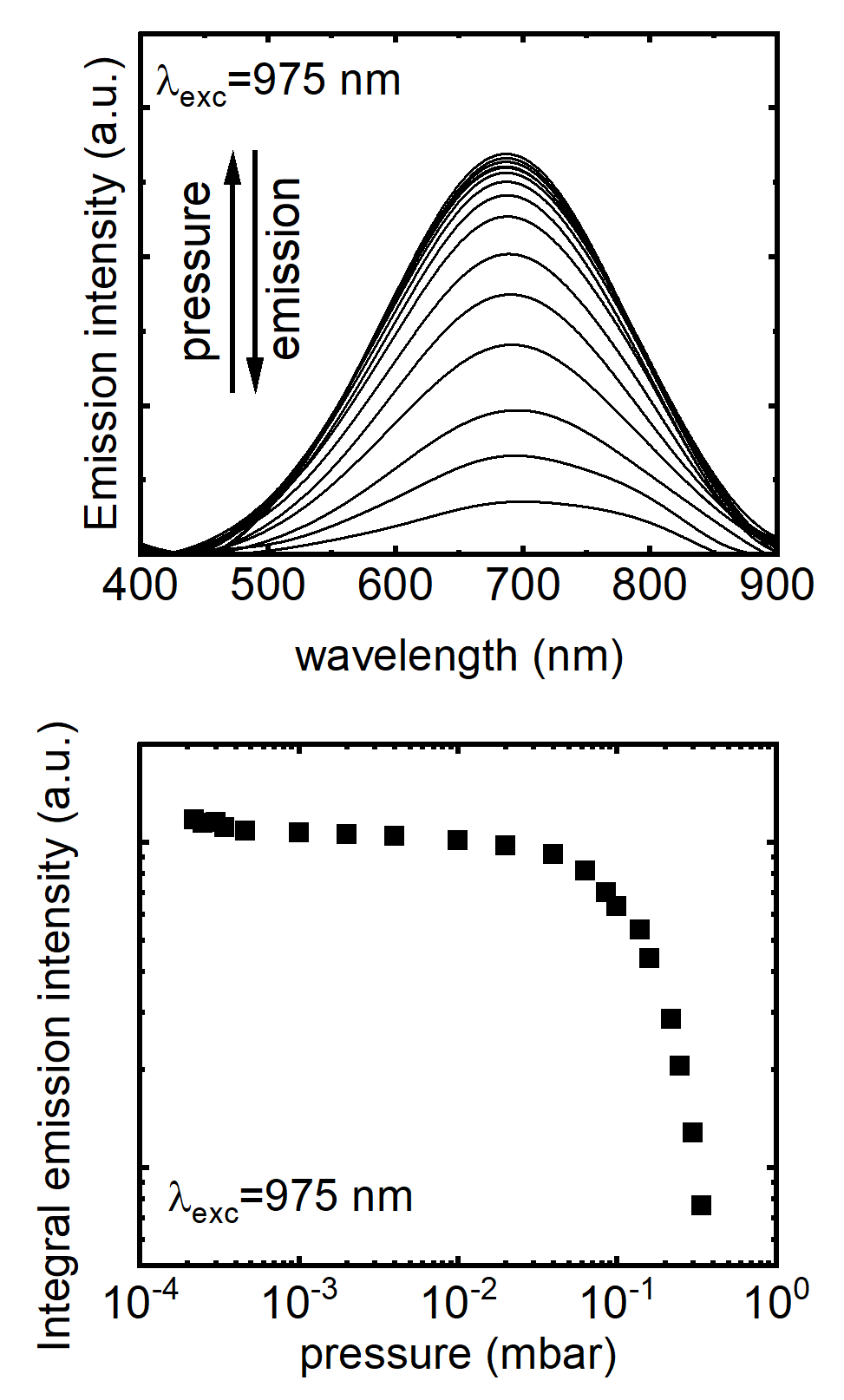
Figure 2. Pressure dependence of LIWE upon IR excitation.

== Sample temperature ==
Taking into account that broadband LIWE occurs upon illumination of the focused beam of infrared laser diode, it seems necessary to determine the sample temperature during the experiment. Several approaches to achieving this goal can be found in the literature. First is to use a thermal camera. Results obtained using this technique indicate that the sample temperature is below 1000 °C. However it should be kept in mind, that the principle of this device is to determine the temperature from the sample surface, from a small point arising as a result of irradiation with a laser beam. Therefore, the measurement may be inaccurate, because the temperature of the sample in the entire volume may be different from the temperature determined from a single, small point on the surface. To define the sample temperature during the LIWE generation process, temperature markers in the form of up-conversion materials can be used. The sample temperature values determined using this method are similar to those obtained with a thermal camera. The third approach is to fit the spectral curve using Plank's law to determine the temperature of the sample during exposure. Results obtained using this method show values over 2000 °C.

== Laser-induced photocurrent ==
The LIWE phenomenon is accompanied by efficient photocurrent generation and hot electron emission. It was found that no effects were observed for the pumping power density below the LIWE generation threshold (1 W). However, above this threshold the conductivity increases with the excitation power. The conductivity for low frequencies (near DC) usually increases by several orders of magnitude after exposure of the sample with the maximum power of the excitation diode compared to the sample in the dark. The effects associated with photoconductivity found in the materials studied so far can be explained using the hopping mechanism. Similar tendency of photoelectric phenomena can be observed in other host reported in literature.

== Mechanisms ==
The broadband anti-Stokes white emission is observed from many different materials. However, to date, there is no unambiguous model that should be used for its interpretation. Some scientists assume that LIWE is a thermal process. In this case, it is natural to use the black body radiation (BBR) model to describe this phenomenon. In general, the theory of BBR assumes that objects heated to a sufficiently high temperature will emit white light. This means that its emission spectrum strongly depends on temperature and their curve course, which is comparable to the course of LIWE, can be well fitted using Planck's law. Moreover, usually shift of the emission maximum with increasing sample temperature (with pumping power) is observed according to the Wien's law. This suggests that the applied model is correct. Unfortunately, often the sample temperature value obtained from fitting the emission spectrum is higher than the melting point of the material. This raises doubts about the validity of the BBR model.

For this reason, scientists have started research on alternative mechanisms explaining generation of the broadband anti-Stokes white luminescence. One of them assumes formation of RE^{2+}-CT clusters as a result of multiphoton absorption process. However, many further experimental and theoretical investigations led to modification of this model. It involves ionization of the host as a consequence of its illumination with a concentrated beam of an IR laser diode. In result, free electrons in the conductivity band (CB) arise. They combine with the ions already located in CB to form pairs between ions with different degrees of oxidation states. As a consequence, the intervalence charge transfer (IVCT) transitions appeared resulting in LIWE generation.

Another approach presented for inorganic materials considers the creation of oxygen vacancies due to thermal effects caused by the increased sample temperature, as a result of irradiation with a concentrated IR laser beam. Then, excited electrons are captured from the excited levels of the host by oxygen vacancies through tunneling process. Subsequently, the electrons return to the valence band via radiation transitions. In case of organic materials, scientists proposed a mechanism closely related to the size of the HOMO–LUMO gap and the morphology of analyzed compound. They report that irradiation of the sample by near infrared (NIR) CW laser diode causes excitation of electrons located near Fermi level. Due to the fact that their energy is below HOMO–LUMO gap, the kind of ligands strongly influences on the emission energy. It was found that carbon based materials also show the ability to generate LIWE under strong excitation. Recently reported mechanism assumes ionization of the graphene associated with intense NIR excitation, which leads to a temporary disturbance of the electronic order of its ground state. In consequence, hybridization of carbon atoms changes from sp^{2} to sp^{3} resulting in opening of the graphene band gap and finally generating LIWE.
