= Ionic partition diagram =

Similar to Pourbaix diagrams for the speciation of redox species as a function of the redox potential and the pH, ionic partition diagrams indicate in which phase an acid or a base is predominantly present in a biphasic system as a function of the Galvani potential difference between the two phases and the pH of the aqueous solution. One of the functions of these diagrams is to reveal drug transport across biological membranes.

== See also ==
- ITIES
- Lipophilicity
- Partition coefficient
