= Volta potential =

Effect in electrochemistry

The Volta potential (also called Volta effect, Volta potential difference, contact potential difference, outer potential difference, Δψ, or "delta psi") in electrochemistry, is the electrostatic potential difference between two metals (or one metal and one electrolyte) that are in contact and are in thermodynamic equilibrium. Specifically, it is the potential difference between a point close to the surface of the first metal and a point close to the surface of the second metal (or electrolyte).

The Volta potential is named after Alessandro Volta.

== Description ==
When the two metals depicted here are in thermodynamic equilibrium with each other as shown (equal Fermi levels), the vacuum electrostatic potential ϕ is not flat due to a difference in work function.

When two metals are electrically isolated from each other, an arbitrary potential difference may exist between them. However, when two different neutral metal surfaces are brought into electrical contact (even indirectly, say, through a long electro-conductive wire), electrons will flow from the metal with the higher Fermi level to the metal with the lower Fermi level until the Fermi levels in the two phases are equal. Once this has occurred, the metals are in thermodynamic equilibrium with each other (the actual number of electrons that passes between the two phases is usually small). Just because the Fermi levels are equal, however, does not mean that the electric potentials are equal. The electric potential outside each material is controlled by its work function, and so dissimilar metals can show an electric potential difference even at equilibrium.

The Volta potential is not an intrinsic property of the two bulk metals under consideration, but rather is determined by work function differences between the metals' surfaces. Just like the work function, the Volta potential depends sensitively on surface state, contamination, and so on.

== Measurement ==
Kelvin probe energy diagram at flat vacuum configuration, used for measuring Volta potential between sample and probe.

The Volta potential can be significant (of order 1 volt) but it cannot be measured directly by an ordinary voltmeter. A voltmeter does not measure vacuum electrostatic potentials, but instead the difference in Fermi level between the two materials, a difference that is exactly zero at equilibrium.

The Volta potential, however, corresponds to a real electric field in the spaces between and around the two metal objects, a field generated by the accumulation of charges at their surfaces. The total charge $Q$ over each object's surface depends on the capacitance $C$ between the two objects, by the relation $Q = C \Delta \psi$, where $\Delta \psi$ is the Volta potential. It follows therefore that the value of the potential can be measured by varying the capacitance between the materials by a known amount (e.g., by moving the objects further from each other) and measuring the displaced charge that flows through the wire that connects them.

The Volta potential difference between a metal and an electrolyte can be measured in a similar fashion. The Volta potential of a metal surface can be mapped on very small scales by use of a Kelvin probe force microscope, based on atomic force microscopy. Over larger areas on the order of millimeters to centimeters, a scanning Kelvin probe (SKP), which uses a wire probe of tens to hundreds of microns in size, can be used. In either case the capacitance change is not known—instead, a compensating DC voltage is added to cancel the Volta potential so that no current is induced by the change in capacitance. This compensating voltage is the negative of the Volta potential.

== See also ==
- Electrode potential
- Absolute electrode potential
- Electric potential
- Galvani potential
- Potential difference (voltage)
- Band bending
- Volt
