= Lipophilicity =

Affinity of a molecule or a moiety for a lipophilic environment

Lipophilicity (from Greek λίπος "fat" and φίλος "friendly") is the ability of a chemical compound to dissolve in fats, oils, lipids, and non-polar solvents such as hexane or toluene. Such compounds are called lipophilic (translated as "fat-loving" or "fat-liking"). Such non-polar solvents are themselves lipophilic, and the adage "like dissolves like" generally holds true. Thus lipophilic substances tend to dissolve in other lipophilic substances, whereas hydrophilic ("water-loving") substances tend to dissolve in water and other hydrophilic substances.Lipophilicity, hydrophobicity, and non-polarity may describe the same tendency towards participation in the London dispersion force, as the terms are often used interchangeably. However, the terms "lipophilic" and "hydrophobic" are not synonymous, as can be seen with silicones and fluorocarbons, which are hydrophobic but not lipophilic.

== Surfactants ==
Hydrocarbon-based surfactants are compounds that are amphiphilic (or amphipathic), having a hydrophilic, water interactive "end", referred to as their "head group", and a lipophilic "end", usually a long chain hydrocarbon fragment, referred to as their "tail". They congregate at low energy surfaces, including the air-water interface (lowering surface tension) and the surfaces of the water-immiscible droplets found in oil/water emulsions (lowering interfacial tension). At these surfaces they naturally orient themselves with their head groups in water and their tails either sticking up and largely out of water (as at the air-water interface) or dissolved in the water-immiscible phase that the water is in contact with (e.g. as the emulsified oil droplet). In both these configurations the head groups strongly interact with water while the tails avoid all contact with water. Surfactant molecules also aggregate in water as micelles with their head groups sticking out and their tails bunched together. Micelles draw oily substances into their hydrophobic cores, explaining the basic action of soaps and detergents used for personal cleanliness and for laundering clothes. Micelles are also biologically important for the transport of fatty substances in the small intestine surface in the first step that leads to the absorption of the components of fats (largely fatty acids and 2-monoglycerides).

Cell membranes are bilayer structures principally formed from phospholipids, molecules which have a highly water interactive, ionic phosphate head groups attached to two long alkyl tails.

By contrast, fluorosurfactants are not amphiphilic or detergents because fluorocarbons are not lipophilic.

Oxybenzone, a common cosmetic ingredient often used in sunscreens, penetrates the skin particularly well because it is not very lipophilic. Anywhere from 0.4% to 8.7% of oxybenzone can be absorbed after one topical sunscreen application, as measured in urine excretions.

== See also ==
- Ionic partition diagram
- ITIES
- Lipophilic bacteria
- Lipophobicity
- Microemulsion
