= Work function =

Type of energy

In solid-state physics, the work function is the minimum thermodynamic work (i.e., energy) needed to remove an electron from a solid to a point in the vacuum immediately outside the solid surface. Here "immediately" means that the final electron position is far from the surface on the atomic scale, but still too close to the solid to be influenced by ambient electric fields in the vacuum. The work function is not a characteristic of a bulk material, but rather a property of the surface of the material because it depends on the crystal face and any surface coatings or contamination. Work functions are useful for analyzing energy level alignment at material interfaces, contact potential differences, and electron emission such as thermionic emission and field electron emission. Work functions of clean elemental metals range from about 2 eV for caesium to about 6 eV for iridium, and they vary by a few tenths of an eV between different crystal faces.

== Definition ==
The work function W for a given surface is defined by the difference

$$W = -e\phi - E_{\rm F},$$

where −e is the charge of an electron, ϕ is the electrostatic potential in the vacuum near the surface, and E_{F} is the Fermi level (electrochemical potential of electrons) inside the material. The term −eϕ is the energy of an electron at rest in the vacuum near the surface.

Plot of electron energy levels against position, in a gold-vacuum-aluminium system. The two metals depicted here are in complete thermodynamic equilibrium (same voltage and temperature). The difference in work function for these two metals results in a vacuum electrostatic potential ϕ that is sloped, meaning that there is an electric field in the vacuum space.

For two surfaces having different work functions W and W' and held at the same temperature and same voltage (by electrically shorting them together), the difference between the electrostatic potentials near each surface, called the contact potential difference, is

$$\phi-\phi' = \frac{1}{-e}(W - W')$$

Since ϕ and ϕ' depend on the material surfaces, the space between two dissimilar conductors that are shorted together will have a built-in electric field, meaning an electric field that is present even when zero voltage is applied. Similarly, the vacuum space near different crystal faces or surface coatings of the same crystal will have such as built-in electric field, also called a patch field.

The work function refers to removal of an electron to a position that is far enough from the surface (many nm) that the force between the electron and its image charge in the surface can be neglected. The electron must also be close to the surface compared to the nearest edge of a crystal facet, or to any other change in the surface structure, such as a change in the material composition, surface coating or reconstruction. The built-in electric field that results from these structures, and any other ambient electric field present in the vacuum are excluded in defining the work function.

== Applications ==
Thermionic emission
In thermionic electron guns, the work function and temperature of the hot cathode are critical parameters in determining the amount of current that can be emitted. Tungsten, the common choice for vacuum tube filaments, can survive to high temperatures but its emission is somewhat limited due to its relatively high work function (approximately 4.5 eV). By coating the tungsten with a substance of lower work function (e.g., thorium or barium oxide), the emission can be greatly increased. This prolongs the lifetime of the filament by allowing operation at lower temperatures (for more information, see hot cathode).
Band bending models in solid-state electronics
The behavior of a solid-state device is strongly dependent on the size of various Schottky barriers and band offsets in the junctions of differing materials, such as metals, semiconductors, and insulators. Some commonly used heuristic approaches to predict the band alignment between materials, such as Anderson's rule and the Schottky–Mott rule, are based on the thought experiment of two materials coming together in vacuum, such that the surfaces charge up and adjust their work functions to become equal just before contact. In reality these work function heuristics are inaccurate due to their neglect of numerous microscopic effects. However, they provide a convenient estimate until the true value can be determined by experiment.
Equilibrium electric fields in vacuum chambers
Variation in work function between different surfaces causes a non-uniform electrostatic potential in the vacuum. Even on an ostensibly uniform surface, variations in W known as patch potentials are always present due to microscopic inhomogeneities. Patch potentials have disrupted sensitive apparatus that rely on a perfectly uniform vacuum, such as Casimir force experiments and the Gravity Probe B experiment. Critical apparatus may have surfaces covered with molybdenum, which shows low variations in work function between different crystal faces.
Contact electrification
If two conducting surfaces are moved relative to each other, and there is potential difference in the space between them, then an electric current will be driven. This is because the surface charge on a conductor depends on the magnitude of the electric field, which in turn depends on the distance between the surfaces. The externally observed electrical effects are largest when the conductors are separated by the smallest distance without touching (once brought into contact, the charge will instead flow internally through the junction between the conductors). Since two conductors in equilibrium can have a built-in potential difference due to work function differences, this means that bringing dissimilar conductors into contact, or pulling them apart, will drive electric currents. These contact currents can damage sensitive microelectronic circuitry and occur even when the conductors would be grounded in the absence of motion.

== Measurement ==
Many techniques have been developed based on different physical effects to measure the electronic work function of a sample. One may distinguish between two groups of experimental methods for work function measurements: absolute and relative.

- Absolute methods employ electron emission from the sample induced by photon absorption (photoemission), by high temperature (thermionic emission), or by electron tunnelling through a vacuum barrier that is made narrow by use of a large electric field (field electron emission).
- Relative methods determine the difference between the work functions of a sample and reference electrode, by measuring the contact potential difference between them. Experimentally, the current through a vacuum tube diode is used to detect the difference in work functions between the anode and cathode, or the displacement current between the sample and reference is measured by changing in spacing between the electrodes in parallel-plate geometry. For scanning-probe measurement of local work function variations, Kelvin Probe methods are used in a Kelvin probe force microscope. The absolute work function of a sample can be obtained if the work function of the reference electrode is first determined, for example by calibrated it against a previously characterized reference sample.

For inhomogeneous surfaces, the work function varies from place to place, and different methods will yield different values of the typical "work function" as they average or select differently among the microscopic work functions.

=== Methods based on thermionic emission ===
The work function is important in the theory of thermionic emission, where thermal fluctuations provide enough energy to "evaporate" electrons out of a hot material (called the 'emitter') into the vacuum. If these electrons are absorbed by another, cooler material (called the collector) then a measurable electric current will be observed. Thermionic emission can be used to measure the work function of both the hot emitter and cold collector. Generally, these measurements involve fitting to Richardson's law, and so they must be carried out in a low temperature and low current regime where space charge effects are absent.

Energy level diagrams for thermionic diode in forward bias configuration, used to extract all hot electrons coming out from the emitter's surface. The barrier is the vacuum near emitter surface.

In order to move from the hot emitter to the vacuum, an electron's energy must exceed the emitter Fermi level by an amount

$$E_{\rm barrier} = W_{\rm e}$$

determined simply by the thermionic work function of the emitter. If an electric field is applied towards the surface of the emitter, then all of the escaping electrons will be accelerated away from the emitter and absorbed into whichever material is applying the electric field. According to Richardson's law the emitted current density (per unit area of emitter), J_{e} (A/m^{2}), is related to the absolute temperature T_{e} of the emitter by the equation:

$$J_{\rm e} = -A_{\rm e} T_{\rm e}^2 e^{-E_{\rm barrier} / k T_{\rm e}}$$

where k is the Boltzmann constant and the proportionality constant A_{e} is the Richardson's constant of the emitter. In this case, the dependence of J_{e} on T_{e} can be fitted to yield W_{e}.

==== Work function of cold electron collector ====
Energy level diagrams for thermionic diode in retarding potential configuration. The barrier is the vacuum near collector surface.

The same setup can be used to instead measure the work function in the collector, simply by adjusting the applied voltage. If an electric field is applied away from the emitter instead, then most of the electrons coming from the emitter will simply be reflected back to the emitter. Only the highest energy electrons will have enough energy to reach the collector, and the height of the potential barrier in this case depends on the collector's work function, rather than the emitter's.

The current is still governed by Richardson's law. However, in this case the barrier height does not depend on W_{e}. The barrier height now depends on the work function of the collector, as well as any additional applied voltages:

$$E_{\rm barrier} = W_{\rm c} - e (\Delta V_{\rm ce} - \Delta V_{\rm S})$$

where W_{c} is the collector's thermionic work function, ΔV_{ce} is the applied collector–emitter voltage, and ΔV_{S} is the Seebeck voltage in the hot emitter (the influence of ΔV_{S} is often omitted, as it is a small contribution of order 10 mV). The resulting current density J_{c} through the collector (per unit of collector area) is again given by Richardson's Law, except now

$$J_{\rm c} = A T_{\rm e}^2 e^{-E_{\rm barrier}/kT_{\rm e}}$$

where A is a Richardson-type constant that depends on the collector material but may also depend on the emitter material, and the diode geometry. In this case, the dependence of J_{c} on T_{e}, or on ΔV_{ce}, can be fitted to yield W_{c}.

This retarding potential method is one of the simplest and oldest methods of measuring work functions, and is advantageous since the measured material (collector) is not required to survive high temperatures.

=== Methods based on photoemission ===
Photoelectric diode in forward bias configuration, used for measuring the work function W_{e} of the illuminated emitter.

The photoelectric work function is the minimum photon energy required to liberate an electron from a substance, in the photoelectric effect. If the photon's energy is greater than the substance's work function, photoelectric emission occurs and the electron is liberated from the surface. Similar to the thermionic case described above, the liberated electrons can be extracted into a collector and produce a detectable current, if an electric field is applied into the surface of the emitter. Excess photon energy results in a liberated electron with non-zero kinetic energy. It is expected that the minimum photon energy $\hbar \omega$ required to liberate an electron (and generate a current) is

$$\hbar \omega = W_{\rm e}$$

where W_{e} is the work function of the emitter.

Photoelectric measurements require a great deal of care, as an incorrectly designed experimental geometry can result in an erroneous measurement of work function. This may be responsible for the large variation in work function values in scientific literature. Moreover, the minimum energy can be misleading in materials where there are no actual electron states at the Fermi level that are available for excitation. For example, in a semiconductor the minimum photon energy would actually correspond to the valence band edge rather than work function.

Of course, the photoelectric effect may be used in the retarding mode, as with the thermionic apparatus described above. In the retarding case, the dark collector's work function is measured instead.

=== Kelvin probe method ===
Kelvin probe energy diagram at flat vacuum configuration, used for measuring work function difference between sample and probe.

The Kelvin probe technique relies on the detection of an electric field (gradient in ϕ) between a sample material and probe material. The electric field can be varied by the voltage ΔV_{sp} that is applied to the probe relative to the sample. If the voltage is chosen such that the electric field is eliminated (the flat vacuum condition), then

$$e\Delta V_{\rm sp} = W_{\rm s} - W_{\rm p}, \quad \text{when}~\phi~\text{is flat}.$$

Since the experimenter controls and knows ΔV_{sp}, then finding the flat vacuum condition gives directly the work function difference between the two materials. The only question is, how to detect the flat vacuum condition? Typically, the electric field is detected by varying the distance between the sample and probe. When the distance is changed but ΔV_{sp} is held constant, a current will flow due to the change in capacitance. This current is proportional to the vacuum electric field, and so when the electric field is neutralized no current will flow.

Although the Kelvin probe technique only measures a work function difference, it is possible to obtain an absolute work function by first calibrating the probe against a reference material (with known work function) and then using the same probe to measure a desired sample. The Kelvin probe technique can be used to obtain work function maps of a surface with extremely high spatial resolution, by using a sharp tip for the probe (see Kelvin probe force microscope).

== Work functions of elements ==
The work function depends on the configurations of atoms at the surface of the material. For example, on polycrystalline silver the work function is 4.26 eV, but on silver crystals it varies for different crystal faces as (100) face: 4.64 eV, (110) face: 4.52 eV, (111) face: 4.74 eV. Ranges for typical surfaces are shown in the table below.

Work function of elements (eV)
Ag	4.26 – 4.74	Al	4.06 – 4.26	As	3.75
Au	5.10 – 5.47	B	~4.45	Ba	2.52 – 2.70
Be	4.98	Bi	4.31	C	~5
Ca	2.87	Cd	4.08	Ce	2.9
Co	5	Cr	4.5	Cs	1.95
Cu	4.53 – 5.10	Eu	2.5	Fe	4.67 – 4.81
Ga	4.32	Gd	2.90	Hf	3.90
Hg	4.475	In	4.09	Ir	5.00 – 5.67
K	2.29	La	3.5	Li	2.9
Lu	~3.3	Mg	3.66	Mn	4.1
Mo	4.36 – 4.95	Na	2.75	Nb	3.95 – 4.87
Nd	3.2	Ni	5.04 – 5.35	Os	5.93
Pb	4.25	Pd	5.22 – 5.60	Pt	5.12 – 5.93
Rb	2.261	Re	4.72	Rh	4.98
Ru	4.71	Sb	4.55 – 4.70	Sc	3.5
Se	5.9	Si	4.60 – 4.85	Sm	2.7
Sn	4.42	Sr	~2.59	Ta	4.00 – 4.80
Tb	3.00	Te	4.95	Th	3.4
Ti	4.33	Tl	~3.84	U	3.63 – 3.90
V	4.3	W	4.32 – 4.55	Y	3.1
Yb	2.60	Zn	3.63 – 4.9	Zr	4.05

== Physical factors that determine the work function ==
Due to the complications described in the modelling section below, it is difficult to theoretically predict the work function with accuracy. However, various trends have been identified. The work function tends to be smaller for metals with an open lattice, and larger for metals in which the atoms are closely packed. It is somewhat higher on dense crystal faces than open crystal faces, also depending on surface reconstructions for the given crystal face.

=== Surface dipole ===
The work function is not simply dependent on the "internal vacuum level" inside the material (i.e., its average electrostatic potential), because of the formation of an atomic-scale electric double layer at the surface. This surface electric dipole gives a jump in the electrostatic potential between the material and the vacuum.

A variety of factors are responsible for the surface electric dipole. Even with a completely clean surface, the electrons can spread slightly into the vacuum, leaving behind a slightly positively charged layer of material. This primarily occurs in metals, where the bound electrons do not encounter a hard wall potential at the surface but rather a gradual ramping potential due to image charge attraction. The amount of surface dipole depends on the detailed layout of the atoms at the surface of the material, leading to the variation in work function for different crystal faces.

=== Doping and electric field effect (semiconductors) ===
Band diagram of semiconductor-vacuum interface showing electron affinity E_{EA}, defined as the difference between near-surface vacuum energy E_{vac}, and near-surface conduction band edge E_{C}. Also shown: Fermi level E_{F}, valence band edge E_{V}, work function W.

In a semiconductor, the work function is sensitive to the doping level at the surface of the semiconductor. Since the doping near the surface can also be controlled by electric fields, the work function of a semiconductor is also sensitive to the electric field in the vacuum.

The reason for the dependence is that, typically, the vacuum level and the conduction band edge retain a fixed spacing independent of doping. This spacing is called the electron affinity (note that this has a different meaning than the electron affinity of chemistry); in silicon for example the electron affinity is 4.05 eV. If the electron affinity E_{EA} and the surface's band-referenced Fermi level E_{F}-E_{C} are known, then the work function is given by

$$W = E_{\rm EA} + E_{\rm C} - E_{\rm F}$$

where E_{C} is taken at the surface.

From this one might expect that by doping the bulk of the semiconductor, the work function can be tuned. In reality, however, the energies of the bands near the surface are often pinned to the Fermi level, due to the influence of surface states. If there is a large density of surface states, then the work function of the semiconductor will show a very weak dependence on doping or electric field.

=== Theoretical models of metal work functions ===
Theoretical modeling of the work function is difficult, as an accurate model requires a careful treatment of both electronic many body effects and surface chemistry; both of these topics are already complex in their own right.

One of the earliest successful models for metal work function trends was the jellium model, which allowed for oscillations in electronic density nearby the abrupt surface (these are similar to Friedel oscillations) as well as the tail of electron density extending outside the surface. This model showed why the density of conduction electrons (as represented by the Wigner–Seitz radius r_{s}) is an important parameter in determining work function.

The jellium model is only a partial explanation, as its predictions still show significant deviation from real work functions. More recent models have focused on including more accurate forms of electron exchange and correlation effects, as well as including the crystal face dependence (this requires the inclusion of the actual atomic lattice, something that is neglected in the jellium model).

=== Temperature dependence of the electron work function ===
The electron behavior in metals varies with temperature and is largely reflected by the electron work function. A theoretical model for predicting the temperature dependence of the electron work function, developed by Rahemi et al. explains the underlying mechanism and predicts this temperature dependence for various crystal structures via calculable and measurable parameters. In general, as the temperature increases, the EWF decreases via $\varphi(T)=\varphi_0-\gamma\frac{(k_\text{B}T)^2}{\varphi_0}$ and $\gamma$ is a calculable material property which is dependent on the crystal structure (for example, BCC, FCC). $\varphi_0$ is the electron work function at T=0 and $k_\text{B}$ is constant throughout the change.
