= Galvani potential =

Electrochemical property

Galvani potential $\phi$, Volta potential $\psi$ and surface potential $\chi$ in one phase. The corresponding potential differences computed between two phases.

In electrochemistry, the Galvani potential (also called Galvani potential difference, or inner potential difference, Δφ, delta phi) is the electric potential difference between two points in the bulk of two phases. These phases can be two different solids (e.g., two metals joined), or a solid and a liquid (e.g., a metal electrode submerged in an electrolyte).

The Galvani potential is named after Luigi Galvani.

== Galvani potential between two metals ==
First, consider the Galvani potential between two metals. When two metals are electrically isolated from each other, an arbitrary voltage difference may exist between them. However, when two different metals are brought into electronic contact, electrons will flow from the metal with a lower voltage to the metal with the higher voltage until the Fermi level of the electrons in the bulk of both phases are equal. The actual numbers of electrons that passes between the two phases is small (it depends on the capacitance between the objects), and the occupancies of the electron bands are practically unaffected. Rather, this small increase or decrease in charge results in a shift in all the energy levels in the metals. An electrical double layer is formed at the interface between the two phases.

The equality of the electrochemical potential between the two different phases in contact can be written as:

$$\overline{\mu}_j^{(1)} = \overline{\mu}_j^{(2)}$$

where:

- $\overline{\mu}$ is the electrochemical potential
- j denotes the species which are the carrier of electric current in the system (which are electrons in metals)
- (1) and (2) denote phase 1 and phase 2, respectively.

Now, the electrochemical potential of a species is defined as a sum of its chemical potential and the local electrostatic potential:

$$\overline{\mu}_j = \mu_j + z_j F \phi$$

where:

- μ is the chemical potential
- z is the electrical charge carried by a single charge carrier (unity for electrons)
- F is the Faraday constant
- Φ is the electrostatic potential

From the two equations above:

$$\phi^{(2)} - \phi^{(1)} = \frac {\mu_j^{(1)} - \mu_j^{(2)}} {z_j F}$$

where the difference on the left-hand side is the Galvani potential difference between the phases (1) and (2). Thus, the Galvani potential difference is determined entirely by the chemical difference of the two phases; specifically by the difference of the chemical potential of the charge carriers in the two phases.

The Galvani potential difference between an electrode and electrolyte (or between other two electrically conductive phases) forms in an analogous fashion, although the chemical potentials in the equation above may need to include all species involved in the electrochemical reaction at the interface.

== Relation to measured cell potential ==
The Galvani potential difference is not directly measurable using voltmeters. The measured potential difference between two metal electrodes assembled into a cell does not equal the difference of the Galvani potentials of the two metals (or their combination with the solution Galvani potential) because the cell needs to contain another metal-metal interface, as in the following schematic of a galvanic cell:

M^{(1)} | S | M^{(2)} | M^{(1)'}

where:

- M^{(1)} and M^{(2)} are the two different metals,
- S denotes the electrolyte,
- M^{(1)'} is the additional metal (here assumed to be the metal (1)) that must be inserted into the circuit to close it,
- the vertical bar, |, denotes a phase boundary.

Instead, the measured cell potential can be written as:

$$E^{(2)} - E^{(1)} = \left(\phi^{(2)} - \phi^{(S)} - \frac {\mu_j^{(2)}} {z_j F}\right) - \left(\phi^{(1)} - \phi^{(S)} - \frac {\mu_j^{(1)}} {z_j F}\right) = \left(\phi^{(2)} - \phi^{(1)}\right) - \left(\frac {\mu_j^{(2)} - \mu_j^{(1)}} {z_j F}\right)$$

where:

- E is the potential of a single electrode,
- (S) denotes the electrolyte solution.

From the above equation, two metals in electronic contact (i.e., under electronic equilibrium) must have the same electrode potential. Also, the electrochemical potentials of the electrons within the two metals will be the same. However, their Galvani potentials will be different (unless the metals are identical).

Moreover, if define $\pi$, the electric potential (or the electromotive potential), as

$$\pi=-\frac{\mu_e}{F}+\phi$$,

which is effectively negative of the reduced electrochemical potential of electrons given in units of volts. It is noted that what one experimentally measures using an inert metallic probe and a voltmeter is $\pi$.

== See also ==
- Absolute electrode potential
- Electrode potential
- ITIES (interface between two immiscible electrolyte solutions)
- Volta potential
- Donnan potential
