= Fermi level =

Quantity in solid state thermodynamics

Filling of the electronic states in various types of materials at equilibrium. Here, height is energy while width is the density of available states for a certain energy in the material listed. The shade follows the Fermi–Dirac distribution (black: all states filled, white: no state filled). In metals and semimetals the Fermi level E_{F} lies inside at least one band. In insulators and semiconductors the Fermi level is inside a band gap; however, in semiconductors the bands are near enough to the Fermi level to be thermally populated with electrons or holes. "intrin." indicates intrinsic semiconductors.

The Fermi level of a solid-state body is the thermodynamic work required to add one electron to the body. It is a thermodynamic quantity usually denoted by μ or E_{F} for brevity. The Fermi level does not include the work required to remove the electron from wherever it came from. The concept of the Fermi level is an important component of the electronic band structure model for determining electronic properties, especially as it relates to the voltage and flow of charge in electronic circuits.

In band structure theory, used in solid state physics to analyze the energy levels in a solid, the Fermi level can be considered to be a hypothetical energy level of an electron, such that at thermodynamic equilibrium this energy level would have a 50% probability of being occupied at any given time. The position of the Fermi level in relation to the band energy levels is a crucial factor in determining electrical properties. The Fermi level does not necessarily correspond to an actual energy level (in an insulator the Fermi level lies in the band gap), nor does it require the existence of a band structure. Nonetheless, the Fermi level is a precisely defined thermodynamic quantity, and differences in Fermi level can be measured with a voltmeter.

== Voltage measurement ==
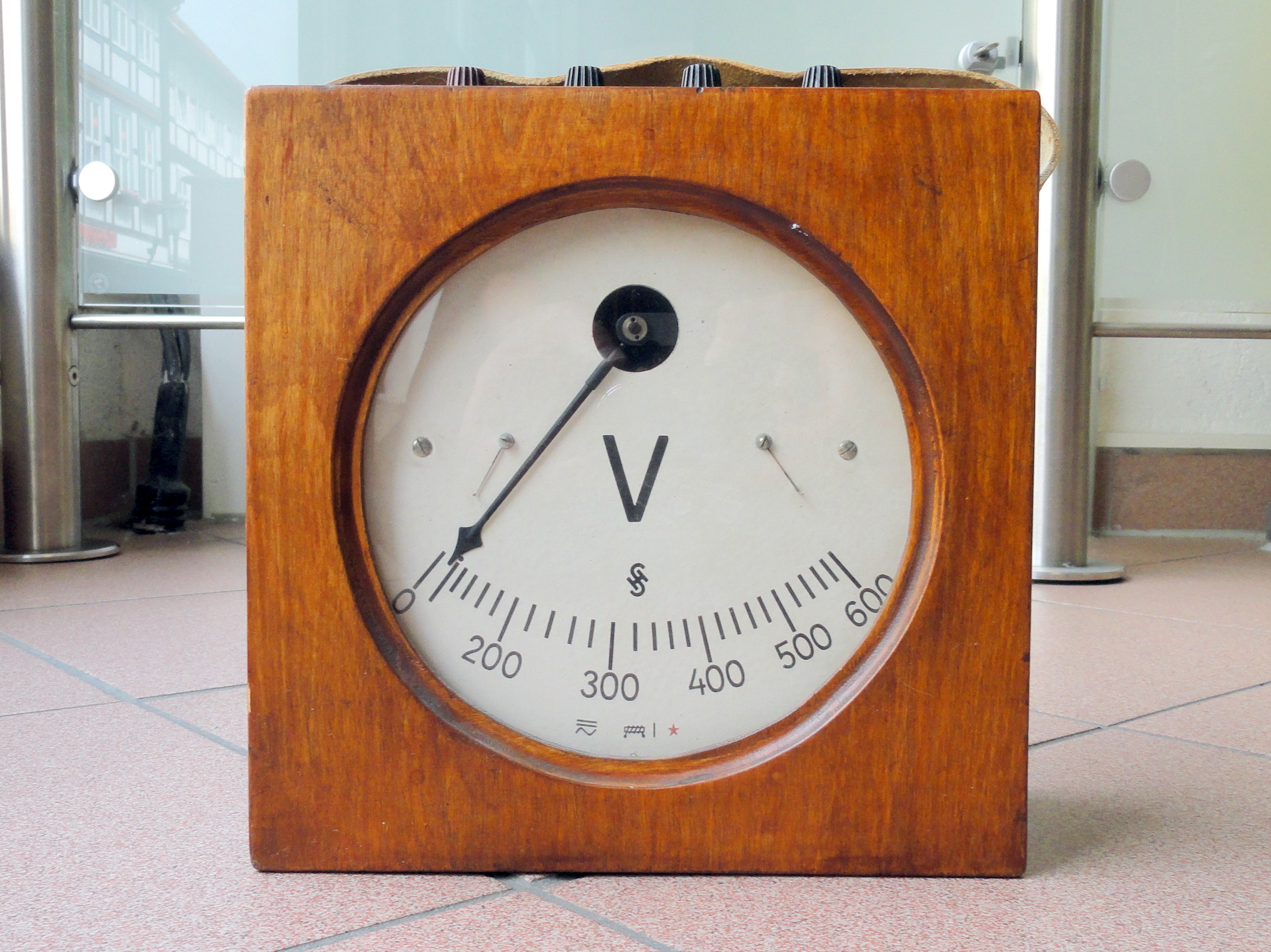
A voltmeter measures differences in Fermi level divided by electron charge.

Sometimes it is said that electric currents are driven by differences in electrostatic potential (Galvani potential), but this is not exactly true. As a counterexample, multi-material devices such as p–n junctions contain internal electrostatic potential differences at equilibrium, yet without any accompanying net current; if a voltmeter is attached to the junction, one simply measures zero volts. The electrostatic potential is not the only factor influencing the flow of charge in a material—Pauli repulsion, carrier concentration gradients, electromagnetic induction, and thermal effects also play an important role.

In fact, the quantity called voltage as measured in an electronic circuit has a simple relationship to the chemical potential for electrons (Fermi level). When the leads of a voltmeter are attached to two points in a circuit, the displayed voltage is a measure of the total work transferred when a unit charge is allowed to move from one point to the other. If a simple wire is connected between two points of differing voltage (forming a short circuit), current will flow from positive to negative voltage, converting the available work into heat.

The Fermi level of a body expresses the work required to add an electron to it, or equally the work obtained by removing an electron. Therefore, V_{A} − V_{B}, the observed difference in voltage between two points, A and B, in an electronic circuit is exactly related to the corresponding chemical potential difference, μ_{A} − μ_{B}, in Fermi level by the formula
$$V_\mathrm{A} - V_\mathrm{B} = \frac{\mu_\mathrm{A} - \mu_\mathrm{B}}{-e}$$
where −e is the electron charge.

From the above discussion it can be seen that electrons will move from a body of high μ (low voltage) to low μ (high voltage) if a simple path is provided. This flow of electrons will cause the lower μ to increase (due to charging or other repulsion effects) and likewise cause the higher μ to decrease. Eventually, μ will settle down to the same value in both bodies. This leads to an important fact regarding the equilibrium (off) state of an electronic circuit:

An electronic circuit in thermodynamic equilibrium will have a constant Fermi level throughout its connected parts.

This also means that the voltage (measured with a voltmeter) between any two points will be zero, at equilibrium. Note that thermodynamic equilibrium here requires that the circuit be internally connected and not contain any batteries or other power sources, nor any variations in temperature.

== Band structure of solids ==
Fermi-Dirac distribution $f(\epsilon)$ vs. energy $\epsilon$, with μ = 0.55 eV and for various temperatures in the range 50 K ≤ T ≤ 375 K.

In the band theory of solids, electrons occupy a series of bands composed of single-particle energy eigenstates each labelled by ϵ. Although this single particle picture is an approximation, it greatly simplifies the understanding of electronic behaviour and it generally provides correct results when applied correctly.

The Fermi–Dirac distribution, $f(\epsilon)$, gives the probability that (at thermodynamic equilibrium) a state having energy ϵ is occupied by an electron:
$$f(\epsilon) = \frac{1}{e^{(\epsilon - \mu)/k_\mathrm{B} T} + 1}$$

Here, T is the absolute temperature and k_{B} is the Boltzmann constant. If there is a state at the Fermi level (ϵ = μ), then this state will have a 50% chance of being occupied. The distribution is plotted in the left figure. The closer f is to 1, the higher chance this state is occupied. The closer f is to 0, the higher chance this state is empty.

The location of μ within a material's band structure is important in determining the electrical behaviour of the material.

- In an insulator, μ lies within a large band gap, far away from any states that are able to carry current.
- In a metal, semimetal or degenerate semiconductor, μ lies within a delocalized band. A large number of states nearby μ are thermally active and readily carry current.
- In an intrinsic or lightly doped semiconductor, μ is close enough to a band edge that there are a dilute number of thermally excited carriers residing near that band edge.

In semiconductors and semimetals the position of μ relative to the band structure can usually be controlled to a significant degree by doping or gating. These controls do not change μ which is fixed by the electrodes, but rather they cause the entire band structure to shift up and down (sometimes also changing the band structure's shape). For further information about the Fermi levels of semiconductors, see (for example) Sze.

=== Local conduction band referencing, internal chemical potential and the parameter ζ ===
If the symbol ℰ is used to denote an electron energy level measured relative to the energy of the edge of its enclosing band, ϵ_{C}, then in general we have $\text{ℰ} = \varepsilon - \varepsilon_{\rm C}.$ We can define a parameter ζ that references the Fermi level with respect to the band edge:
$$\zeta = \mu - \epsilon_{\rm C}.$$
It follows that the Fermi–Dirac distribution function can be written as:
$$f(\mathcal{E}) = \frac{1}{e^{(\mathcal{E} - \zeta)/k_\mathrm{B} T} + 1}.$$
The band theory of metals was initially developed by Sommerfeld, from 1927 onwards, who focused on the underlying thermodynamics and statistical mechanics. Confusingly, in some contexts the band-referenced quantity ζ may be called the Fermi level, chemical potential, or electrochemical potential, leading to ambiguity with the globally-referenced Fermi level. In this article, the terms conduction-band referenced Fermi level or internal chemical potential are used to refer to ζ.

Example of variations in conduction band edge E_{C} in a band diagram of GaAs/AlGaAs heterojunction-based high-electron-mobility transistor.

ζ is directly related to the number of active charge carriers as well as their typical kinetic energy, and hence it is directly involved in determining the local properties of the material (such as electrical conductivity). For this reason it is common to focus on the value of ζ when concentrating on the properties of electrons in a single, homogeneous conductive material. By analogy to the energy states of a free electron, the ℰ of a state is the kinetic energy of that state and ϵ_{C} is its potential energy. With this in mind, the parameter, ζ, could also be labelled the Fermi kinetic energy.

Unlike μ, the parameter, ζ, is not a constant at equilibrium, but rather varies from location to location in a material due to variations in ϵ_{C}, which is determined by factors such as material quality and impurities/dopants. Near the surface of a semiconductor or semimetal, ζ can be strongly controlled by externally applied electric fields, as is done in a field effect transistor. In a multi-band material, ζ may even take on multiple values in a single location. For example, in a piece of aluminum there are two conduction bands crossing the Fermi level (even more bands in other materials); each band has a different edge energy, ϵ_{C}, and a different ζ.

The value of ζ at zero temperature is widely known as the Fermi energy, sometimes written ζ_{0}. Confusingly (again), the name Fermi energy sometimes is used to refer to ζ at non-zero temperature.

== Out of equilibrium ==
The Fermi level, μ, and temperature, T, are well defined constants for a solid-state device in thermodynamic equilibrium situation, such as when it is sitting on the shelf doing nothing. When the device is brought out of equilibrium and put into use, then strictly speaking the Fermi level and temperature are no longer well defined. Fortunately, it is often possible to define a quasi-Fermi level and quasi-temperature for a given location, that accurately describe the occupation of states in terms of a thermal distribution. The device is said to be in quasi-equilibrium when and where such a description is possible.

Quasi-fermi levels (dashed) of electrons and holes in a p-n junction under forward bias, corresponding to out-of-equilibrium charge carrier densities (filled curves).

The quasi-equilibrium approach allows one to build a simple picture of some non-equilibrium effects as the electrical conductivity of a piece of metal (as resulting from a gradient of μ) or its thermal conductivity (as resulting from a gradient in T). The quasi-μ and quasi-T can vary (or not exist at all) in any non-equilibrium situation, such as:

- If the system contains a chemical imbalance (as in a battery).
- If the system is exposed to changing electromagnetic fields (as in capacitors, inductors, and transformers).
- Under illumination from a light-source with a different temperature, such as the sun (as in solar cells),
- When the temperature is not constant within the device (as in thermocouples),
- When the device has been altered, but has not had enough time to re-equilibrate (as in piezoelectric or pyroelectric substances).

In some situations, such as immediately after a material experiences a high-energy laser pulse, the electron distribution cannot be described by any thermal distribution. One cannot define the quasi-Fermi level or quasi-temperature in this case; the electrons are simply said to be non-thermalized. In less dramatic situations, such as in a solar cell under constant illumination, a quasi-equilibrium description may be possible but requiring the assignment of distinct values of μ and T to different bands (conduction band vs. valence band). Even then, the values of μ and T may jump discontinuously across a material interface (e.g., p–n junction) when a current is being driven, and be ill-defined at the interface itself.

== Technicalities ==
=== Nomenclature ===
The term Fermi level is mainly used in discussing the solid state physics of electrons in semiconductors, and a precise usage of this term is necessary to describe band diagrams in devices comprising different materials with different levels of doping. In these contexts, however, one may also see Fermi level used imprecisely to refer to the band-referenced Fermi level, μ − ϵ_{C}, called ζ above. It is common to see scientists and engineers refer to "controlling", "pinning", or "tuning" the Fermi level inside a conductor, when they are in fact describing changes in ϵ_{C} due to doping or the field effect. In fact, thermodynamic equilibrium guarantees that the Fermi level in a conductor is always fixed to be exactly equal to the Fermi level of the electrodes; only the band structure (not the Fermi level) can be changed by doping or the field effect (see also band diagram). A similar ambiguity exists between the terms, chemical potential and electrochemical potential.

It is also important to note that Fermi level is not necessarily the same thing as Fermi energy. In the wider context of quantum mechanics, the term Fermi energy usually refers to the maximum kinetic energy of a fermion in an idealized non-interacting, disorder free, zero temperature Fermi gas. This concept is very theoretical (there is no such thing as a non-interacting Fermi gas, and zero temperature is impossible to achieve). However, it finds some use in approximately describing white dwarfs, neutron stars, atomic nuclei, and electrons in a metal. On the other hand, in the fields of semiconductor physics and engineering, Fermi energy often is used to refer to the Fermi level described in this article.

=== Fermi level referencing and the location of zero Fermi level ===
Much like the choice of origin in a coordinate system, the zero point of energy can be defined arbitrarily. Observable phenomena only depend on energy differences. When comparing distinct bodies, however, it is important that they all be consistent in their choice of the location of zero energy, or else nonsensical results will be obtained. It can therefore be helpful to explicitly name a common point to ensure that different components are in agreement. On the other hand, if a reference point is inherently ambiguous (such as "the vacuum", see below) it will instead cause more problems.

A practical and well-justified choice of common point is a bulky, physical conductor, such as the electrical ground or earth. Such a conductor can be considered to be in a good thermodynamic equilibrium and so its μ is well defined. It provides a reservoir of charge, so that large numbers of electrons may be added or removed without incurring charging effects. It also has the advantage of being accessible, so that the Fermi level of any other object can be measured simply with a voltmeter.

==== Why it is not advisable to use "the energy in vacuum" as a reference zero ====
When the two metals depicted here are in thermodynamic equilibrium as shown (equal Fermi levels E_{F}), the vacuum electrostatic potential ϕ is not flat due to a difference in work function.

In principle, one might consider using the state of a stationary electron in the vacuum as a reference point for energies. This approach is not advisable unless one is careful to define exactly where the vacuum is. (Note: Technically, it is possible to consider the vacuum to be an insulator and in fact its Fermi level is defined if its surroundings are in equilibrium. Typically however the Fermi level is two to five electron volts below the vacuum electrostatic potential energy, depending on the work function of the nearby vacuum wall material. Only at high temperatures will the equilibrium vacuum be populated with a significant number of electrons (this is the basis of thermionic emission).) The problem is that not all points in the vacuum are equivalent.

At thermodynamic equilibrium, it is typical for electrical potential differences of order 1 V to exist in the vacuum (Volta potentials). The source of this vacuum potential variation is the variation in work function between the different conducting materials exposed to vacuum. Just outside a conductor, the electrostatic potential depends sensitively on the material, as well as which surface is selected (its crystal orientation, contamination, and other details).

The parameter that gives the best approximation to universality is the Earth-referenced Fermi level suggested above. This also has the advantage that it can be measured with a voltmeter.

=== Discrete charging effects in small systems ===
In cases where the "charging effects" due to a single electron are non-negligible, the above definitions should be clarified. For example, consider a capacitor made of two identical parallel-plates. If the capacitor is uncharged, the Fermi level is the same on both sides, so one might think that it should take no energy to move an electron from one plate to the other. But when the electron has been moved, the capacitor has become (slightly) charged, so this does take a slight amount of energy. In a normal capacitor, this is negligible, but in a nano-scale capacitor it can be more important.

In this case one must be precise about the thermodynamic definition of the chemical potential as well as the state of the device: is it electrically isolated, or is it connected to an electrode?

- When the body is able to exchange electrons and energy with an electrode (reservoir), it is described by the grand canonical ensemble. The value of chemical potential μ can be said to be fixed by the electrode, and the number of electrons N on the body may fluctuate. In this case, the chemical potential of a body is the infinitesimal amount of work needed to increase the average number of electrons by an infinitesimal amount (even though the number of electrons at any time is an integer, the average number varies continuously.):
  $$\mu(\left\langle N \right\rangle,T) = \left(\frac{\partial F}{\partial \left\langle N \right\rangle}\right)_T,$$
  where $F(N,T) = \Omega(N,T) + \mu N$ is the Helmholtz free energy of the grand canonical ensemble.
- If the number of electrons in the body is fixed (but the body is still thermally connected to a heat bath), then it is in the canonical ensemble. We can define a "chemical potential" in this case literally as the work required to add one electron to a body that already has exactly N electrons,
  $$\mu'(N, T) = F(N + 1, T) - F(N, T),$$
  where F(N, T) is the free energy function of the canonical ensemble, alternatively,
  $$\mu''(N, T) = F(N, T) - F(N - 1, T) = \mu'(N - 1, T).$$

These chemical potentials are not equivalent, μ ≠ μ′ ≠ μ″, except in the thermodynamic limit. The distinction is important in small systems such as those showing Coulomb blockade, but technically affects large sized semiconductors at zero temperature, at least ideally. The parameter, μ, (i.e., in the case where the number of electrons is allowed to fluctuate) remains exactly related to the voltmeter voltage, even in small systems. To be precise, then, the Fermi level is defined not by a deterministic charging event by one electron charge, but rather a statistical charging event by an infinitesimal fraction of an electron.
