= Electromotive force =

Electrical action produced by a non-electrical source

In electromagnetism and electronics, electromotive force (emf, or EMF) or electromotance, denoted $\mathcal{E}$, is an energy transfer to an electric circuit per unit of electric charge, measured in volts. Devices called electrical transducers provide an emf by converting other forms of energy into electrical energy. Other types of electrical equipment also produce an emf, such as batteries, which convert chemical energy, and generators, which convert mechanical energy. This energy conversion is achieved by physical forces applying physical work on electric charges. However, electromotive force itself is not a physical force, and ISO/IEC standards have deprecated the term in favor of source voltage or source tension instead (denoted $U_\mathrm{s}$).

An electronic–hydraulic analogy may view emf as the mechanical work done to water by a pump, which results in a pressure difference (analogous to voltage).

In electromagnetic induction, emf can be defined around a closed loop of a conductor as the electromagnetic work that would be done on an elementary electric charge (such as an electron) if it travels once around the loop.

For two-terminal devices modeled as a Thévenin equivalent circuit, an equivalent emf can be measured as the open-circuit voltage between the two terminals. This emf can drive an electric current if an external circuit is attached to the terminals, in which case the device becomes the voltage source of that circuit.

Although an emf gives rise to a voltage and can be measured as a voltage and may sometimes informally be called a "voltage", they are not the same phenomenon (see § Distinction with potential difference).

== Overview ==
Devices that can provide emf include electrochemical cells, thermoelectric devices, solar cells, photodiodes, electrical generators, inductors, transformers and even Van de Graaff generators. In nature, emf is generated when magnetic field fluctuations occur through a surface. For example, the shifting of the Earth's magnetic field during a geomagnetic storm induces currents in an electrical grid as the lines of the magnetic field are shifted about and cut across the conductors.

In a battery, the charge separation that gives rise to a potential difference (voltage) between the terminals is accomplished by chemical reactions at the electrodes that convert chemical potential energy into electromagnetic potential energy. A voltaic cell can be thought of as having a "charge pump" of atomic dimensions at each electrode, that is:

A (chemical) source of emf can be thought of as a kind of charge pump that acts to move positive charges from a point of low potential through its interior to a point of high potential. ... By chemical, mechanical or other means, the source of emf performs work $\mathrm{d}W$ on that charge to move it to the high-potential terminal. The emf $\mathcal{E}$ of the source is defined as the work $\mathrm{d}W$ done per charge $\mathrm{d}q$. $\textstyle \mathcal{E} = \frac{\mathrm{d}W}{\mathrm{d}q}$.

In an electrical generator, a time-varying magnetic field inside the generator creates an electric field via electromagnetic induction, which creates a potential difference between the generator terminals. Charge separation takes place within the generator because electrons flow away from one terminal toward the other, until, in the open-circuit case, an electric field is developed that makes further charge separation impossible. The emf is countered by the electrical voltage due to charge separation. If a load is attached, this voltage can drive a current. The general principle governing the emf in such electrical machines is Faraday's law of induction.

== History ==
In 1801, Alessandro Volta introduced the term "force motrice électrique" to describe the active agent of a battery (which he had invented around 1798). This is called the "electromotive force" in English.

Around 1830, Michael Faraday established that chemical reactions at each of two electrode–electrolyte interfaces provide the "seat of emf" for the voltaic cell. That is, these reactions drive the current and are not an endless source of energy as the earlier obsolete theory thought. In the open-circuit case, charge separation continues until the electrical field from the separated charges is sufficient to arrest the reactions. Years earlier, Alessandro Volta, who had measured a contact potential difference at the metal–metal (electrode–electrode) interface of his cells, held the incorrect opinion that contact alone (without taking into account a chemical reaction) was the origin of the emf. It is independent of size of the cell but depends on the nature of the electrolyte used.

== Notation and units of measurement ==
Electromotive force (emf) is typically denoted by the symbol $\mathcal E$ (script "E"). It represents the energy provided by a source per unit electric charge. The standard unit of emf in the International System of Units (SI) is the volt (V).

In a device without internal resistance, if an electric charge $q$ passing through that device gains an energy $W$ via work, the net emf for that device is the energy gained per unit charge: $\textstyle \tfrac{W}{q}$. Like other measures of energy per charge, emf uses the SI unit volt, which is equivalent to a joule (SI unit of energy) per coulomb (SI unit of charge).

Electromotive force in electrostatic units is the statvolt (in the centimeter gram second system of units equal in amount to an erg per electrostatic unit of charge).

== Formal definitions ==
Inside a source of emf (such as a battery) that is open-circuited, a charge separation occurs between the negative terminal N and the positive terminal P. This leads to an electrostatic field $\boldsymbol{E}_\mathrm{open\ circuit}$ that points from P to N, whereas the emf of the source must be able to drive current from N to P when connected to a circuit. This led Max Abraham to introduce the concept of a nonelectrostatic field $\boldsymbol{E}'$ that exists only inside the source of emf. In the open-circuit case, $\boldsymbol{E}' = - \boldsymbol{E}_\mathrm{open\ circuit}$, while when the source is connected to a circuit the electric field $\boldsymbol{E}$ inside the source changes but $\boldsymbol{E}'$ remains essentially the same. In the open-circuit case, the conservative electrostatic field created by separation of charge exactly cancels the forces producing the emf. Expressed mathematically:
$$\mathcal{E}_\mathrm{source}  = \int_{N}^{P} \boldsymbol{E}' \cdot \mathrm{d} \boldsymbol{ \ell }
= - \int_{N}^{P} \boldsymbol{E}_\mathrm{open\ circuit} \cdot \mathrm{d} \boldsymbol{ \ell }
=V_P - V_N \ ,$$

where $\boldsymbol{E}_\mathrm{open\ circuit}$ is the conservative electrostatic field created by the charge separation associated with the emf, $\mathrm{d}\boldsymbol{\ell}$ is an element of the path from terminal N to terminal P, ⋅ (dot operator) denotes the vector dot product, and $V$ is the electric scalar potential. This emf is the work done on a unit charge by the source's nonelectrostatic field $\boldsymbol{E}'$ when the charge moves from N to P.

When the source is connected to a load, its emf is just
$$\mathcal{E}_\mathrm{source} = \int_{N}^{P} \boldsymbol{E}' \cdot \mathrm{d} \boldsymbol{ \ell}\ ,$$
and no longer has a simple relation to the electric field $\boldsymbol{E}$ inside it.

In the case of a closed path in the presence of a varying magnetic field, the integral of the electric field around the (stationary) closed loop $C$ may be nonzero. Then, the "induced emf" (often called the "induced voltage") in the loop is:
$$\mathcal{E}_C = \oint_{C} \boldsymbol{E} \cdot \mathrm{d} \boldsymbol{ \ell }
= - \frac{\mathrm{d}\Phi_C}{\mathrm{d}t}
= - \frac{\mathrm{d}}{\mathrm{d}t} \oint_{C} \boldsymbol{A} \cdot \mathrm{d} \boldsymbol{ \ell }\ ,$$

where $\boldsymbol{E}$ is the entire electric field, conservative and non-conservative, and the integral is around an arbitrary, but stationary, closed curve $C$ through which there is a time-varying magnetic flux $\Phi_C$, and $\boldsymbol{A}$ is the vector potential. The electrostatic field does not contribute to the net emf around a circuit because the electrostatic portion of the electric field is conservative (i.e., the work done against the field around a closed path is zero, by Kirchhoff's voltage law, which is valid, as long as the circuit elements remain at rest and radiation is ignored). That is, the "induced emf" (like the emf of a battery connected to a load) is not a "voltage" in the sense of a difference in the electric scalar potential.

If the loop $C$ is a conductor that carries current $I$ in the direction of integration around the loop, and the magnetic flux is due to that current, we have that $\Phi_B = L I$, where $L$ is the self inductance of the loop. If in addition, the loop includes a coil that extends from point 1 to 2, such that the magnetic flux is largely localized to that region, it is customary to speak of that region as an inductor, and to consider that its emf is localized to that region. Then, we can consider a different loop $C'$ that consists of the coiled conductor from 1 to 2, and an imaginary line down the center of the coil from 2 back to 1. The magnetic flux, and emf, in loop $C'$ is essentially the same as that in loop $C$:
$$\mathcal{E}_C = \mathcal{E}_{C'}
= - \frac{\mathrm{d}\Phi_{C'}}{\mathrm{d}t}
= - L \frac{\mathrm{d}I}{\mathrm{d}t}
= \oint_C \boldsymbol{E} \cdot \mathrm{d} \boldsymbol{ \ell }
= \int_1^2 \boldsymbol{E}_\mathrm{conductor} \cdot \mathrm{d} \boldsymbol{ \ell }
- \int_1^2 \boldsymbol{E}_\mathrm{center\ line} \cdot \mathrm{d} \boldsymbol{ \ell }\ .$$

For a good conductor, $\boldsymbol{E}_\mathrm{conductor}$ is negligible, so we have, to a good approximation,
$$L \frac{\mathrm d I}{\mathrm dt}
= \int_1^2 \boldsymbol{E}_\mathrm{center\ line} \cdot \mathrm{d} \boldsymbol{ \ell }
= V_1 - V_2\ ,$$
where $V$ is the electric scalar potential along the centerline between points 1 and 2.

Thus, we can associate an effective "voltage drop" $L\,\mathrm{d}I /\mathrm{d}t$ with an inductor (even though our basic understanding of induced emf is based on the vector potential rather than the scalar potential), and consider it as a load element in Kirchhoff's voltage law,
$$\sum \mathcal{E}_\mathrm{source} = \sum_\mathrm{load\ elements} \mathrm{voltage\ drops},$$

where now the induced emf is not considered to be a source emf.

This definition can be extended to arbitrary sources of emf and paths $C$ moving with velocity $\boldsymbol{v}$ through the electric field $\boldsymbol{E}$ and magnetic field $\boldsymbol{B}$:
$$\begin{align}
\mathcal{E} &= \oint_{C} \left[\boldsymbol{E}  + \boldsymbol{v} \times \boldsymbol{B} \right] \cdot \mathrm{d} \boldsymbol{ \ell } \\
&\qquad+\frac{1}{q}\oint_{C}\mathrm {Effective \ chemical \ forces \ \cdot} \ \mathrm{d} \boldsymbol{ \ell } \\
&\qquad\qquad+\frac{1}{q}\oint_{C}\mathrm { Effective \ thermal \ forces\ \cdot}\  \mathrm{d} \boldsymbol{ \ell } \ ,
\end{align}$$

which is a conceptual equation mainly, because the determination of the "effective forces" is difficult. The term $\oint_{C} \left[\boldsymbol{E} + \boldsymbol{v} \times \boldsymbol{B} \right] \cdot \mathrm{d} \boldsymbol{ \ell }$ is often called a "motional emf".

== In (electrochemical) thermodynamics ==
When multiplied by an amount of charge $\mathrm{d}Q$ the emf $\mathcal{E}$ yields a thermodynamic work term $\mathcal{E}\,\mathrm{d}Q$ that is used in the formalism for the change in Gibbs energy when charge is passed in a battery:
$$\mathrm{d}G = -S\,\mathrm{d}T + V\,\mathrm{d}P + \mathcal{E}\,\mathrm{d}Q\ ,$$
where $G$ is the Gibbs free energy, $S$ is the entropy, $V$ is the system volume, $P$ is its pressure, and $T$ is its absolute temperature.

The combination $(\mathcal{E}, Q)$ is an example of a conjugate pair of variables. At constant pressure the above relationship produces a Maxwell relation that links the change in open cell voltage with temperature $T$ (a measurable quantity) to the change in entropy $S$ when charge is passed isothermally and isobarically. The latter is closely related to the reaction entropy of the electrochemical reaction that lends the battery its power. This Maxwell relation is:
$$\left(\frac{\partial \mathcal{E}}{\partial T}\right)_Q =
-\left(\frac{\partial S}{\partial Q}\right)_T$$

If a mole of ions goes into solution (for example, in a Daniell cell, as discussed below) the charge through the external circuit is:
$$\Delta Q = -n_0 F_0 ,$$

where $n_0$ is the number of electrons/ion, and $F_0$ is the Faraday constant and the minus sign indicates discharge of the cell. Assuming constant pressure and volume, the thermodynamic properties of the cell are related strictly to the behavior of its emf by:

$$\Delta H = -n_0 F_0 \left( \mathcal{E} - T \frac {\mathrm{d}\mathcal{E}}{\mathrm{d}T}\right) \, ,$$

where $\Delta H$ is the enthalpy of reaction. The quantities on the right are all directly measurable. Assuming constant temperature and pressure:

$$\Delta G = -n_0 F_0\mathcal{E}$$

which is used in the derivation of the Nernst equation.

== Distinction with potential difference ==
Although an electrical potential difference (voltage) is sometimes called an emf, they are formally distinct concepts:

- Potential difference is a more general term that includes emf.
- Emf is the cause of a potential difference.
- In a circuit of a voltage source and a resistor, the sum of the source's applied voltage plus the ohmic voltage drop through the resistor is zero. But the resistor provides no emf, only the voltage source does:
  - For a circuit using a battery source, the emf is due solely to the chemical forces in the battery.
  - For a circuit using an electric generator, the emf is due solely to a time-varying magnetic forces within the generator.
- Both a 1 volt emf and a 1 volt potential difference correspond to 1 joule per coulomb of charge.

In the case of an open circuit, the electric charge that has been separated by the mechanism generating the emf creates an electric field opposing the separation mechanism. For example, the chemical reaction in a voltaic cell stops when the opposing electric field at each electrode is strong enough to arrest the reactions. A larger opposing field can reverse the reactions in what are called reversible cells.

The electric charge that has been separated creates an electric potential difference that can (in many cases) be measured with a voltmeter between the terminals of the device, when not connected to a load. The magnitude of the emf for the battery (or other source) is the value of this open-circuit voltage. When the battery is charging or discharging, the emf itself cannot be measured directly using the external voltage because some voltage is lost inside the source. It can, however, be inferred from a measurement of the current $I$ and potential difference $V$, provided that the internal resistance $R$ already has been measured:
$$\mathcal{E} = V_\text{load} + IR \, .$$

"Potential difference" is not the same as "induced emf" (often called "induced voltage"). The potential difference (difference in the electric scalar potential) between two points A and B is independent of the path we take from A to B. If a voltmeter always measured the potential difference between A and B, then the position of the voltmeter would make no difference. However, it is quite possible for the measurement by a voltmeter between points A and B to depend on the position of the voltmeter, if a time-dependent magnetic field is present. For example, consider an infinitely long solenoid using an AC current to generate a varying flux in the interior of the solenoid. Outside the solenoid we have two resistors connected in a ring around the solenoid. The resistor on the left is 100 Ω and the one on the right is 200 Ω, they are connected at the top and bottom at points A and B. The induced voltage, by Faraday's law is $V$, so the current $I = V/(100+200)$. Therefore, the voltage across the 100 Ω resistor is $100 \ I$ and the voltage across the 200 Ω resistor is $200 \ I$, yet the two resistors are connected on both ends, but $V_{AB}$ measured with the voltmeter to the left of the solenoid is not the same as $V_{AB}$ measured with the voltmeter to the right of the solenoid.

== Generation ==
=== Chemical sources ===
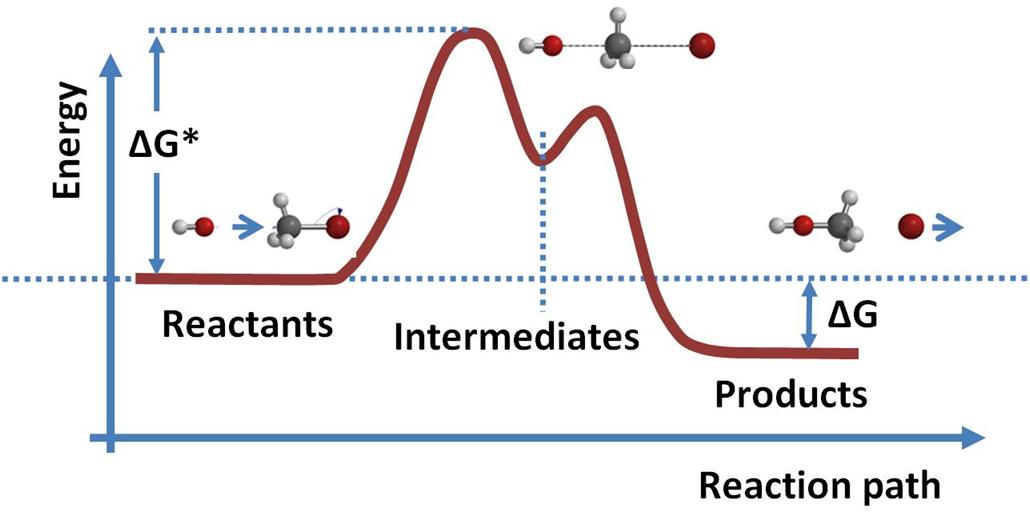
A typical reaction path requires the initial reactants to cross an energy barrier, enter an intermediate state and finally emerge in a lower energy configuration. If charge separation is involved, this energy difference can result in an emf. See Bergmann et al. and Transition state.

Galvanic cell using a salt bridge

The question of how batteries (galvanic cells) generate an emf occupied scientists for most of the 19th century. The "seat of the electromotive force" was eventually determined in 1889 by Walther Nernst to be primarily at the interfaces between the electrodes and the electrolyte.

Atoms in molecules or solids are held together by chemical bonding, which stabilizes the molecule or solid (i.e. reduces its energy). When molecules or solids of relatively high energy are brought together, a spontaneous chemical reaction can occur that rearranges the bonding and reduces the (free) energy of the system. In batteries, coupled half-reactions, often involving metals and their ions, occur in tandem, with a gain of electrons (termed "reduction") by one conductive electrode and loss of electrons (termed "oxidation") by another (reduction-oxidation or redox reactions). The spontaneous overall reaction can only occur if electrons move through an external wire between the electrodes. The electrical energy given off is the free energy lost by the chemical reaction system.

As an example, a Daniell cell consists of a zinc anode (an electron collector) that is oxidized as it dissolves into a zinc sulfate solution. The dissolving zinc leaving behind its electrons in the electrode according to the oxidation reaction (the subscripts (s) stand for solid electrode; (aq) stands for aqueous solution):
$$\mathrm{Zn_{(s)} \rightarrow Zn^{2+}_{(aq)} + 2  e ^- \ }$$

The zinc sulfate is the electrolyte in that half cell. It is a solution which contains zinc cations $\mathrm{Zn}^{2+}$, and sulfate anions $\mathrm{SO}_4^{2-}$ with charges that balance to zero.

In the other half cell, the copper cations in a copper sulfate electrolyte move to the copper cathode to which they attach themselves as they adopt electrons from the copper electrode by the reduction reaction:
$$\mathrm{Cu^{2+}_{(aq)} + 2 e^- \rightarrow Cu_{(s)}\ }$$

which leaves a deficit of electrons on the copper cathode. The difference of excess electrons on the anode and deficit of electrons on the cathode creates an electrical potential between the two electrodes. (A detailed discussion of the microscopic process of electron transfer between an electrode and the ions in an electrolyte may be found in Conway.) The electrical energy released by this reaction (213 kJ per 65.4 g of zinc) can be attributed mostly due to the 207 kJ weaker bonding (smaller magnitude of the cohesive energy) of zinc, which has filled 3d- and 4s-orbitals, compared to copper, which has an unfilled orbital available for bonding.

If the cathode and anode are connected by an external conductor, electrons pass through that external circuit (light bulb in figure), while ions pass through the salt bridge to maintain charge balance until the anode and cathode reach electrical equilibrium of zero volts as chemical equilibrium is reached in the cell. In the process the zinc anode is dissolved while the copper electrode is plated with copper. The salt bridge has to close the electrical circuit while preventing the copper ions from moving to the zinc electrode and being reduced there without generating an external current. It is not made of salt but of material able to wick cations and anions (a dissociated salt) into the solutions. The flow of positively charged cations along the bridge is equivalent to the same number of negative charges flowing in the opposite direction.

If the light bulb is removed (open circuit) the emf between the electrodes is opposed by the electric field due to the charge separation, and the reactions stop.

For this particular cell chemistry, at 298 K (room temperature), the emf $\mathcal{E}$ is 1.0934 V, with a temperature coefficient of $\mathrm{d}\mathcal{E}/\mathrm{d}T$ = −4.53×10^{−4} V/K.

==== Voltaic cells ====
Volta developed the voltaic cell about 1792, and presented his work March 20, 1800. Volta correctly identified the role of dissimilar electrodes in producing the voltage, but incorrectly dismissed any role for the electrolyte. Volta ordered the metals in a 'tension series', "that is to say in an order such that any one in the list becomes positive when in contact with any one that succeeds, but negative by contact with any one that precedes it." A typical symbolic convention in a schematic of this circuit ( –||– ) would have a long electrode 1 and a short electrode 2, to indicate that electrode 1 dominates. Volta's law about opposing electrode emfs implies that, given ten electrodes (for example, zinc and nine other materials), 45 unique combinations of voltaic cells (10 × 9/2) can be created.

==== Typical values ====
The electromotive force produced by primary (single-use) and secondary (rechargeable) cells is usually of the order of a few volts. The figures quoted below are nominal, because emf varies according to the size of the load and the state of exhaustion of the cell.

EMF and cell chemistries of several common voltaic cells
Common name	EMF (volts)	Cell chemistry		
Common name	EMF (volts)	Anode	Solvent, electrolyte	Cathode
nickel-cadmium	1.2	Cadmium	Water, potassium hydroxide	NiO(OH)
nickel–metal hydride	1.2	Mischmetal (hydrogen absorbing)	Water, potassium hydroxide	Nickel
Zinc carbon	1.5	Zinc	Water, ammonium or zinc chloride	Carbon, manganese dioxide
Lead–acid	2.1	Lead	Water, sulfuric acid	Lead dioxide
Lithium-ion	3.6–3.7	Graphite	Organic solvent, Li salts	LiCoO_{2}
Mercury cell	1.35	Zinc	Water, sodium or potassium hydroxide	HgO

==== Other chemical sources ====
Other chemical sources include fuel cells.

=== Electromagnetic induction ===
Electromagnetic induction is the production of a circulating electric field by a time-dependent magnetic field. A time-dependent magnetic field can be produced either by motion of a magnet relative to a circuit, by motion of a circuit relative to another circuit (at least one of these must be carrying an electric current), or by changing the electric current in a fixed circuit. The effect on the circuit itself, of changing the electric current, is known as self-induction; the effect on another circuit is known as mutual induction.

For a given circuit, the electromagnetically induced emf is determined purely by the rate of change of the magnetic flux through the circuit according to Faraday's law of induction.

An emf is induced in a coil or conductor whenever there is change in the flux linkages. Depending on the way in which the changes are brought about, there are two types: When the conductor is moved in a stationary magnetic field to procure a change in the flux linkage, the emf is statically induced. The electromotive force generated by motion is often referred to as motional emf. When the change in flux linkage arises from a change in the magnetic field around the stationary conductor, the emf is dynamically induced. The electromotive force generated by a time-varying magnetic field is often referred to as transformer emf.

=== Contact potentials ===
When solids of two different materials are in contact, thermodynamic equilibrium requires that one of the solids assume a higher electrical potential than the other. This is called the contact potential. Dissimilar metals in contact produce what is known also as a contact electromotive force or Galvani potential. The magnitude of this potential difference is often expressed as a difference in Fermi levels in the two solids when they are at charge neutrality, where the Fermi level (a name for the chemical potential of an electron system) describes the energy necessary to remove an electron from the body to some common point (such as ground). If there is an energy advantage in taking an electron from one body to the other, such a transfer will occur. The transfer causes a charge separation, with one body gaining electrons and the other losing electrons. This charge transfer causes a potential difference between the bodies, which partly cancels the potential originating from the contact, and eventually equilibrium is reached. At thermodynamic equilibrium, the Fermi levels are equal (the electron removal energy is identical) and there is now a built-in electrostatic potential between the bodies. The original difference in Fermi levels, before contact, is referred to as the emf. The contact potential cannot drive steady current through a load attached to its terminals because that current would involve a charge transfer. No mechanism exists to continue such transfer and, hence, maintain a current, once equilibrium is attained.

One might inquire why the contact potential does not appear in Kirchhoff's voltage law as one contribution to the sum of potential drops. The customary answer is that any circuit involves not only a particular diode or junction, but also all the contact potentials due to wiring and so forth around the entire circuit. The sum of all the contact potentials is zero, and so they may be ignored in Kirchhoff's law.

=== Solar cell ===
The equivalent circuit of a solar cell, ignoring parasitic resistances.

Operation of a solar cell can be understood from its equivalent circuit. Photons with energy greater than the bandgap of the semiconductor create mobile electron–hole pairs. Charge separation occurs because of a pre-existing electric field associated with the p-n junction. This electric field is created from a built-in potential, which arises from the contact potential between the two different materials in the junction. The charge separation between positive holes and negative electrons across the p–n diode yields a forward voltage, the photo voltage, between the illuminated diode terminals, which drives current through any attached load. Photo voltage is sometimes referred to as the photo emf, distinguishing between the effect and the cause.

==== Solar cell current–voltage relationship ====
Two internal current losses $I_\mathrm{SH} + I_\mathrm{D}$ limit the total current $I$ available to the external circuit. The light-induced charge separation eventually creates a forward current $I_\mathrm{SH}$ through the cell's internal resistance $R_\mathrm{SH}$ in the direction opposite the light-induced current $I_\mathrm{L}$. In addition, the induced voltage tends to forward bias the junction, which at high enough voltages will cause a recombination current $I_\mathrm{D}$ in the diode opposite the light-induced current.

When the output is short-circuited, the output voltage is zeroed, and so the voltage across the diode is smallest. Thus, short-circuiting results in the smallest $I_\mathrm{SH} + I_\mathrm{D}$ losses and consequently the maximum output current, which for a high-quality solar cell is approximately equal to the light-induced current $I_\mathrm{L}$. Approximately this same current is obtained for forward voltages up to the point where the diode conduction becomes significant.

The current delivered by the illuminated diode to the external circuit can be simplified (based on certain assumptions) to:
$$I = I_\mathrm{L} -I_0 \left( e^{\frac{V}{mV_\mathrm{T}}} - 1 \right) \ .$$

$I_0$ is the reverse saturation current. Two parameters that depend on the solar cell construction and to some degree upon the voltage itself are the ideality factor $m$ and the thermal voltage $V_\mathrm{T} = \tfrac{k T}{q}$, which is about 26 millivolts at room temperature.

==== Solar cell photo emf ====
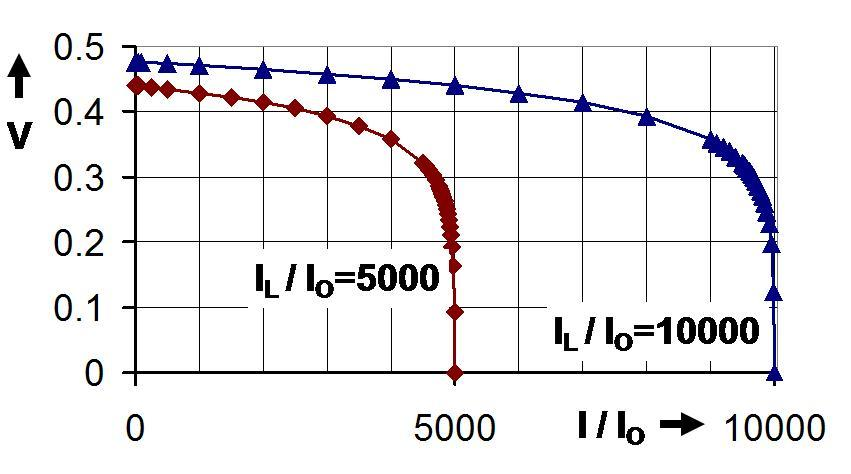
Solar cell output voltage for two light-induced currents I_{L} expressed as a ratio to the reverse saturation current I_{0} and using a fixed ideality factor m of 2. Their emf is the voltage at their y-axis intercept.

Solving the illuminated diode's above simplified current–voltage relationship for output voltage yields:
$$V = mV_\mathrm{T} \ln \left( \frac{I_\mathrm{L} - I}{I_0}+1 \right) \ ,$$
which is plotted against $I / I_0$ in the figure.

The solar cell's photo emf $\mathcal{E}_\text{photo}$ has the same value as the open-circuit voltage $V_\mathrm{oc}$, which is determined by zeroing the output current $I$:
$$\mathcal{E}_\text{photo} = V_\mathrm{oc} = mV_\mathrm{T} \ln \left( \frac{I_\mathrm{L}}{I_0}+1 \right) \ .$$

It has a logarithmic dependence on the light-induced current $I_\mathrm{L}$ and is where the junction's forward bias voltage is just enough that the forward current completely balances the light-induced current. For silicon junctions, it is typically not much more than 0.5 volts. While for high-quality silicon panels it can exceed 0.7 volts in direct sunlight.

When driving a resistive load, the output voltage can be determined using Ohm's law and will lie between the short-circuit value of zero volts and the open-circuit voltage $V_\mathrm{oc}$. When that resistance is small enough such that $I \approx I_\mathrm{L}$ (the near-vertical part of the two illustrated curves), the solar cell acts more like a current generator rather than a voltage generator, since the current drawn is nearly fixed over a range of output voltages. This contrasts with batteries, which act more like voltage generators.

=== Other sources that generate emf ===
- A transformer coupling two circuits may be considered a source of emf for one of the circuits, just as if it were caused by an electrical generator; this is the origin of the term "transformer emf".
- For converting sound waves into voltage signals:
  - a microphone generates an emf from a moving diaphragm.
  - a magnetic pickup generates an emf from a varying magnetic field produced by an instrument.
  - a piezoelectric sensor generates an emf from strain on a piezoelectric crystal.
- Devices that use temperature to produce emfs include thermocouples and thermopiles.
- Any electrical transducer which converts a physical energy into electrical energy.

== See also ==
- Counter-electromotive force
- Electric battery
- Electrochemical cell
- Electrolytic cell
- Galvanic cell
- Magnetomotive force
- Voltaic pile
