= Shockley diode equation =

Electrical engineering equation

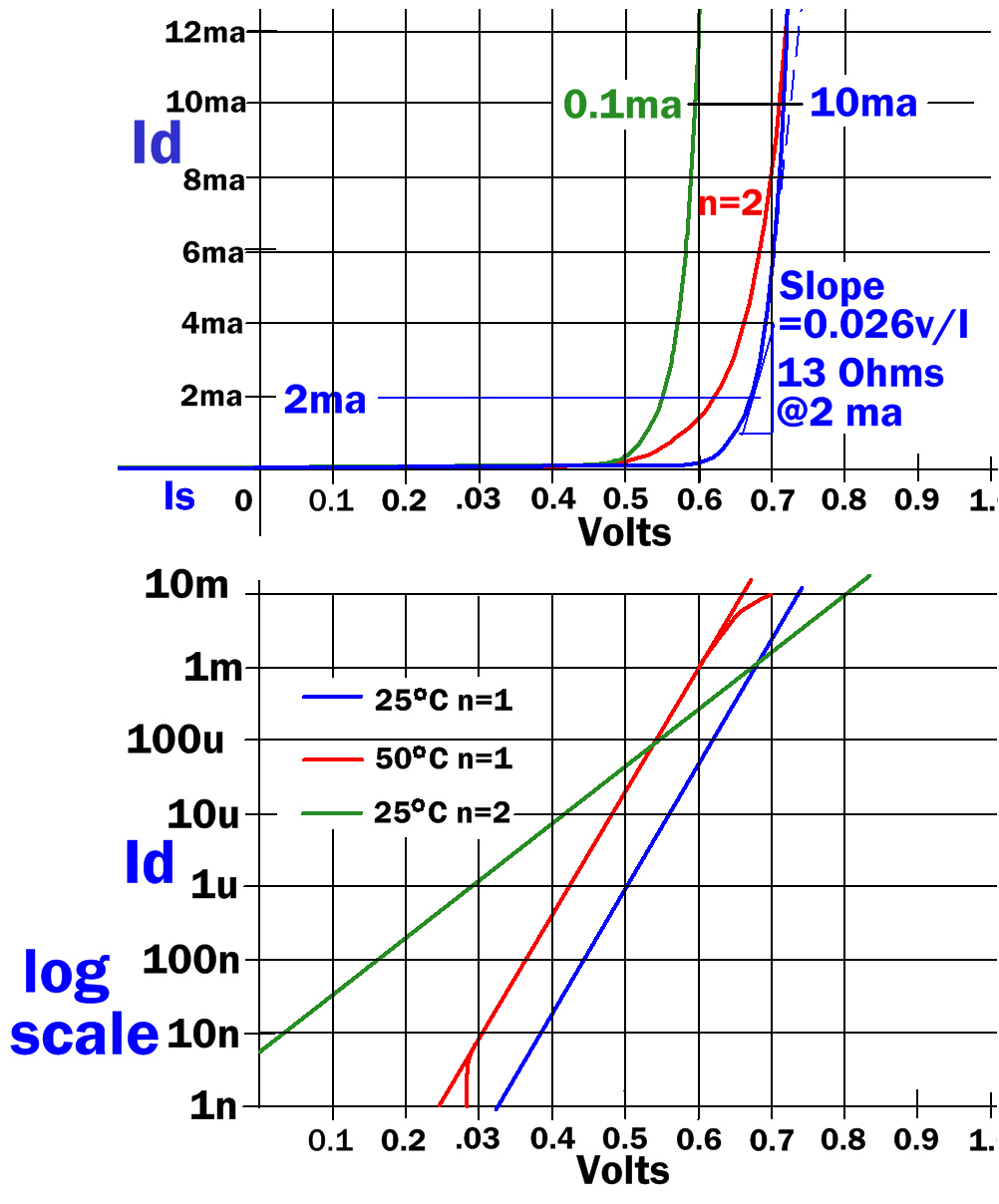
Diode law current–voltage curves at 25 °C, 50 °C, and two ideality factors. The logarithmic scale used for the bottom plot is useful for expressing the equation's exponential relationship.

The Shockley diode equation, or the diode law, named after transistor co-inventor William Shockley of Bell Labs, models the exponential current–voltage (I–V) relationship of semiconductor diodes in moderate constant current forward bias or reverse bias:

$$I_\text{D} = I_\text{S} \left( e^\frac{V_\text{D}}{n V_\text{T}} - 1 \right),$$

where

$I_\text{D}$ is the diode current,
$I_\text{S}$ is the reverse-bias saturation current (or scale current),
$V_\text{D}$ is the voltage across the diode,
$V_\text{T}$ is the thermal voltage, and
$n$ is the ideality factor, also known as the quality factor, emission coefficient, or the material constant.

The equation is called the Shockley ideal diode equation when the ideality factor $n$ equals 1, thus $n$ is sometimes omitted. The ideality factor typically varies from 1 to 2 (though can in some cases be higher), depending on the fabrication process and semiconductor material. The ideality factor was added to account for imperfect junctions observed in real transistors, mainly due to carrier recombination as charge carriers cross the depletion region.

The thermal voltage $V_\text{T}$ is defined as:

$$V_\text{T} = \frac{kT}{q},$$

where

$k$ is the Boltzmann constant,
$T$ is the absolute temperature of the p–n junction, and
$q$ is the elementary charge (the magnitude of an electron's charge).

For example, it is approximately 25.852 mV at 300 K (27 °C; 80 °F).

The reverse saturation current $I_\text{S}$ is not constant for a given device, but varies with temperature; usually more significantly than $V_\text{T}$, so that $V_\text{D}$ typically decreases as $T$ increases.

Under reverse bias, the diode equation's exponential term is near 0, so the current is near the somewhat constant $-I_\text{S}$ reverse current value (roughly a picoampere for silicon diodes or a microampere for germanium diodes, although this is obviously a function of size).

For moderate forward bias voltages the exponential becomes much larger than 1, since the thermal voltage is very small in comparison. The $-1$ in the diode equation is then negligible, so the forward diode current will approximate

$$I_\text{S} e^\frac{V_\text{D}}{n V_\text{T}}.$$

The use of the diode equation in circuit problems is illustrated in the article on diode modeling.

== Limitations ==
Internal resistance causes "leveling off" of a real diode's I–V curve at high forward bias. The Shockley equation doesn't model this, but adding a resistance in series will.

The reverse breakdown region (particularly of interest for Zener diodes) is not modeled by the Shockley equation.

The Shockley equation doesn't model noise (such as Johnson–Nyquist noise from the internal resistance, or shot noise).

The Shockley equation is a constant current (steady state) relationship, and thus doesn't account for the diode's transient response, which includes the influence of its internal junction and diffusion capacitance and reverse recovery time.

== Derivation ==
Shockley derives an equation for the voltage across a p-n junction in a long article published in 1949. Later he gives a corresponding equation for current as a function of voltage under additional assumptions, which is the equation we call the Shockley ideal diode equation. He calls it "a theoretical rectification formula giving the maximum rectification", with a footnote referencing a paper by Carl Wagner, Physikalische Zeitschrift 32, pp. 641–645 (1931).

Band diagram of quasi-fermi levels in a p-n junction under forward bias.

To derive his equation for the voltage, Shockley argues that the total voltage drop can be divided into three parts:

- the drop of the quasi-Fermi level of holes from the level of the applied voltage at the p terminal to its value at the point where doping is neutral (which we may call the junction),
- the difference between the quasi-Fermi level of the holes at the junction and that of the electrons at the junction,
- the drop of the quasi-Fermi level of the electrons from the junction to the n terminal.

He shows that the first and the third of these can be expressed as a resistance times the current: $I_\text{D} R_1.$ As for the second, the difference between the quasi-Fermi levels at the junction, he says that we can estimate the current flowing through the diode from this difference. He points out that the current at the p terminal is all holes, whereas at the n terminal it is all electrons, and the sum of these two is the constant total current. So the total current is equal to the decrease in hole current from one side of the diode to the other. This decrease is due to an excess of recombination of electron-hole pairs over generation of electron-hole pairs. The rate of recombination is equal to the rate of generation when at equilibrium, that is, when the two quasi-Fermi levels are equal. When the quasi-Fermi levels are not equal, then the recombination rate is $e^{(\phi_\text{p} - \phi_\text{n}) / V_\text{T}}$ times the rate of generation. We then assume that most of the excess recombination (or decrease in hole current) takes place in a layer going by one hole diffusion length $L_\text{p}$ into the n material and one electron diffusion length $L_\text{n}$ into the p material, and that the difference between the quasi-Fermi levels is constant in this layer at $V_\text{J}.$ Then we find that the total current, or the drop in hole current, is

$$I_\text{D} = I_\text{S} \left(e^\frac{V_\text{J}}{V_\text{T}} - 1\right),$$

where

$$I_\text{S} = g q(L_\text{p} + L_\text{n}),$$

and $g$ is the generation rate. We can solve for $V_\text{J}$ in terms of $I_\text{D}$:

$$V_\text{J} = V_\text{T} \ln\left(1 + \frac{I_\text{D}}{I_\text{S}}\right),$$

and the total voltage drop is then

$$V = I_\text{D} R_1 + V_\text{T} \ln\left(1 + \frac{I_\text{D}}{I_\text{S}}\right).$$

When we assume that $R_1$ is small, we obtain $V = V_\text{J}$ and the Shockley ideal diode equation.

The small current that flows under high reverse bias is then the result of thermal generation of electron–hole pairs in the layer. The electrons then flow to the n terminal, and the holes to the p terminal. The concentrations of electrons and holes in the layer is so small that recombination there is negligible.

In 1950, Shockley and coworkers published a short article describing a germanium diode that closely followed the ideal equation.

In 1954, Bill Pfann and W. van Roosbroek (who were also of Bell Telephone Laboratories) reported that while Shockley's equation was applicable to certain germanium junctions, for many silicon junctions the current (under appreciable forward bias) was proportional to $e^{V_\text{J}/AV_\text{T}},$ with A having a value as high as 2 or 3. This is the ideality factor $n$ above.

Feynman gave a derivation using the Brownian ratchet in The Feynman Lectures on Physics I.46.

== Photovoltaic energy conversion ==
In 1981, Alexis de Vos and Herman Pauwels showed that a more careful analysis of the quantum mechanics of a junction, under certain assumptions, gives a current versus voltage characteristic of the form

$$I_\text{D}(V) = -qA[F_i - 2F_o(V)],$$

in which A is the cross-sectional area of the junction, and F_{i} is the number of incoming photons per unit area, per unit time, with energy over the band-gap energy, and F_{o}(V) is outgoing photons, given by

$$F_o(V) = \int_{\nu_g}^\infty \frac{1}{\exp\left(\frac{h\nu - qV}{kT_c}\right) - 1} \frac{2\pi\nu^2}{c^2} \,d\nu.$$

The factor of 2 multiplying the outgoing flux is needed because photons are emitted from both sides, but the incoming flux is assumed to come from just one side. Although the analysis was done for photovoltaic cells under illumination, it applies also when the illumination is simply background thermal radiation, provided that a factor of 2 is then used for this incoming flux as well. The analysis gives a more rigorous expression for ideal diodes in general, except that it assumes that the cell is thick enough that it can produce this flux of photons. When the illumination is just background thermal radiation, the characteristic is

$$I_\text{D}(V) = 2q[F_o(V) - F_o(0)].$$

Note that, in contrast to the Shockley law, the current goes to infinity as the voltage goes to the gap voltage hν_{g}/q. This of course would require an infinite thickness to provide an infinite amount of recombination.

This equation was recently revised to account for the new temperature scaling in the revised current $I_\text{S}$ using a recent model for 2D materials based Schottky diode.
