= Diffusion capacitance =

Diffusion Capacitance is the capacitance that happens due to transport of charge carriers between two terminals of a device, for example, the diffusion of carriers from anode to cathode in a forward biased diode or from emitter to base in a forward-biased junction of a transistor. (Note: The "forward biased" in this context means that the diode/transistor allows the current to flow.) In a semiconductor device with a current flowing through it (for example, an ongoing transport of charge by diffusion) at a particular moment there is necessarily some charge in the process of transit through the device. If the applied voltage changes to a different value and the current changes to a different value, a different amount of charge will be in transit in the new circumstances. The change in the amount of transiting charge divided by the change in the voltage causing it is the diffusion capacitance. The adjective "diffusion" is used because the original use of this term was for junction diodes, where the charge transport was via the diffusion mechanism. See Fick's laws of diffusion.

To implement this notion quantitatively, at a particular moment in time let the voltage across the device be $V$. Now assume that the voltage changes with time slowly enough that at each moment the current is the same as the DC current that would flow at that voltage, say $I=I(V)$ (the quasistatic approximation). Suppose further that the time to cross the device is the forward transit time ${\tau}_F$. In this case the amount of charge in transit through the device at this particular moment, denoted $Q$, is given by

$$Q=I(V){\tau}_F$$.

Consequently, the corresponding diffusion capacitance:$C_{diff}$=

$$C_{diff} =\begin{matrix}\frac{dQ}{dV}\end{matrix}=\begin{matrix}\frac{dI(V)}{dV}\end{matrix} {\tau}_F$$.

In the event the quasi-static approximation does not hold, that is, for very fast voltage changes occurring in times shorter than the transit time ${\tau}_F$, the equations governing time-dependent transport in the device must be solved to find the charge in transit, for example the Boltzmann equation. That problem is a subject of continuing research under the topic of non-quasistatic effects. See Liu , and Gildenblat et al.
