= Quasi Fermi level =

Term used in quantum mechanics

A quasi Fermi level is a term used in quantum mechanics and especially in solid state physics for the Fermi level (chemical potential of electrons) that describes the population of electrons separately in the conduction band and valence band, when their populations are displaced from equilibrium. This displacement could be caused by the application of an external voltage, or by exposure to light of energy $E>E_g$, which alter the populations of electrons in the conduction band and valence band. Since recombination rate (the rate of equilibration between bands) tends to be much slower than the energy relaxation rate within each band, the conduction band and valence band can each have an individual population that is internally in equilibrium, even though the bands are not in equilibrium with respect to exchange of electrons. The displacement from equilibrium is such that the carrier populations can no longer be described by a single Fermi level, however it is possible to describe using concept of separate quasi-Fermi levels for each band.

== Definition ==
When a semiconductor is in thermal equilibrium, the distribution function of the electrons at the energy level of E is presented by a Fermi–Dirac distribution function. In this case the Fermi level is defined as the level in which the probability of occupation of electron at that energy is 1/2. In thermal equilibrium, there is no need to distinguish between conduction band quasi-Fermi level and valence band quasi-Fermi level as they are simply equal to the Fermi level.

When a disturbance from a thermal equilibrium situation occurs, the populations of the electrons in the conduction band and valence band change. If the disturbance is not too great or not changing too quickly, the bands each relax to a state of quasi thermal equilibrium. Because the relaxation time for electrons within the conduction band is much lower than across the band gap, we can consider that the electrons are in thermal equilibrium in the conduction band. This is also applicable for electrons in the valence band (often understood in terms of holes). We can define a quasi Fermi level and quasi temperature due to thermal equilibrium of electrons in conduction band, and quasi Fermi level and quasi temperature for the valence band similarly.

We can state the general Fermi function for electrons in conduction band as
$$f_{\rm c}(k,r)\approx f_0(E,E_{\rm Fc},T_{\rm c})$$
and for electrons in valence band as
$$f_{\rm v}(k,r)\approx f_0(E,E_{\rm Fv},T_{\rm v})$$
where:

- $f_0(E,E_{\rm F},T)=\frac{1}{e^{(E-E_{\rm F})/(k_{\rm B}T)}+1}$ is the Fermi–Dirac distribution function,
- $E_{\rm Fc}$ is the conduction band quasi-Fermi level at location r,
- $E_{\rm Fv}$ is the valence band quasi-Fermi level at location r,
- $T_c$ is the conduction band temperature,
- $T_v$ is the valence band temperature,
- $f_{\rm c}(k,r)$ is the probability that a particular conduction-band state, with wavevector k and position r, is occupied by an electron,
- $f_{\rm v}(k,r)$ is the probability that a particular valence-band state, with wavevector k and position r, is occupied by an electron (i.e. not occupied by a hole).
- $E$ is the energy of the conduction- or valence-band state in question,
- $k_{\rm B}$ is the Boltzmann constant.

== p–n junction ==
As shown in the figure below, the conduction band and valence band in a p–n junction is indicated by blue solid line in the left, and quasi Fermi level is indicated by the red dashed line.

When there is no external voltage(bias) applied to a p–n junction, the quasi Fermi levels for electron and holes overlap with one another. As bias increase, the valence band of the p-side gets pulled down, and so did the hole quasi Fermi level. As a result separation of hole and electron quasi Fermi level increased.

p–n junction operation in forward bias mode showing reducing depletion width. Both p and n junctions are doped at a 10^{15} /cm^{3} doping level, leading to built-in potential of ~ 0.59 V. Observe the different quasi-fermi levels for conduction band and valence band in n and p regions (red curves).

== Application ==
This simplification will help us in many areas. For example, we can use the same equation for electron and hole densities used in thermal equilibrium, but substituting the quasi-Fermi levels and temperature. That is, if we let $n$ be the spatial density of conduction band electrons and $p$ be the spatial density of holes in a material, and if the Boltzmann approximation holds, i.e. assuming the electron and hole densities are not too high, then
$$n = n(E_{\rm F_c})$$
$$p = p(E_{\rm F_v})$$
where $n(E)$ is the spatial density of conduction band electrons that would be present in thermal equilibrium if the Fermi level were at $E$, and $p(E)$ is the spatial density of holes that would be present in thermal equilibrium if the Fermi level were at $E$.

A current (due to the combined effects of drift and diffusion) will only appear if there is a variation in the Fermi or quasi Fermi level. The current density for electron flow can be shown to be proportional to the gradient in the electron quasi Fermi level. For if we let $\mu$ be the electron mobility, and $E_{F}(\mathbf{r})$ be the quasi fermi energy at the spatial point $\mathbf{r}$, then we have
$$\mathbf{J}_n(\mathbf{r}) =\mu_nn\cdot (\nabla E_{\rm F_c})$$
Similarly, for holes, we have
$$\mathbf{ J}_p(\mathbf{r})= \mu_pp\cdot (\nabla E_{\rm F_v})$$
