= Saturation current =

Limit of flowing current through a device

The saturation current (or scale current), more accurately the reverse saturation current, is the part of the reverse current in a semiconductor diode caused by diffusion of minority carriers from the neutral regions to the depletion region. This current is almost independent of the reverse voltage.

The reverse bias saturation current $I_\text{S}$ for an ideal p–n diode is:

$$I_\text{S} = q A n_\text{i}^2 \left( \frac{1}{N_\text{D}} \sqrt{\frac{D_\text{p}}{\tau_\text{p}}} + \frac{1}{N_\text{A}} \sqrt{\frac{D_\text{n}}{\tau_\text{n}}} \right),\,$$

where

$q$ is elementary charge
$A$ is the cross-sectional area
$D_\text{p}, D_\text{n}$ are the diffusion coefficients of holes and electrons, respectively,
$N_\text{D}, N_\text{A}$ are the donor and acceptor concentrations at the n side and p side, respectively,
$n_\text{i}$ is the intrinsic carrier concentration in the semiconductor material,
$\tau_\text{p}, \tau_\text{n}$ are the carrier lifetimes of holes and electrons, respectively.

Increase in reverse bias does not allow the majority charge carriers to diffuse across the junction. However, this potential helps some minority charge carriers in crossing the junction. Since the minority charge carriers in the n-region and p-region are produced by thermally generated electron-hole pairs, these minority charge carriers are extremely temperature dependent and independent of the applied bias voltage. The applied bias voltage acts as a forward bias voltage for these minority charge carriers and a current of small magnitude flows in the external circuit in the direction opposite to that of the conventional current due to the movement of majority charge carriers.

Note that the saturation current is not a constant for a given device; it varies with temperature; this variance is the dominant term in the temperature coefficient for a silicon diode.

== See also ==
- Reverse leakage current, the reverse current arising from all causes
