= Semiconductor characterization techniques =

Experimental techniques to characterize semiconductor devices and materials

Semiconductor characterization techniques are used to characterize a semiconductor material or device (p–n junction, Schottky diode, solar cell, etc.). Some examples of semiconductor properties that could be characterized include the depletion width, carrier concentration, carrier generation and recombination rates, carrier lifetimes, defect concentration, and trap states.

== Electrical characterization techniques ==
Electrical characterization can be used to determine resistivity, carrier concentration, mobility, contact resistance, barrier height, depletion width, oxide charge, interface states, carrier lifetimes, and deep level impurities.

- Two-point probe
- Four-point probe
- Differential Hall effect
- Capacitance voltage profiling
- Deep-level transient spectroscopy (DLTS)
- Electron beam-induced current
- Drive-level capacitance profiling (DLCP)
- Current–voltage characteristic (I–V)
- Suns–V_{OC} (Pseudo I–V)
- Photoconductance decay (PCD)

== Optical characterization techniques ==
- Microscopy
- Ellipsometry
- Photoluminescence
- Electroluminescence
- Absorption or transmission spectroscopy
- Raman spectroscopy
- Fourier-transform infrared spectroscopy
- Reflectance modulation
- Cathodoluminescence

== Physical and chemical characterization techniques ==
- Electron beam techniques
  - Scanning Electron Microscopy (SEM)
  - Transmission Electron Microscopy (TEM)
  - Auger electron spectroscopy (AES)
  - Electron microprobe (EMP)
  - Electron energy loss spectroscopy (EELS)
- Ion beam techniques
  - Sputtering
  - Secondary ion mass spectrometry (SIMS)
  - Rutherford backscattering spectrometry (RBS)
- X-ray techniques
  - X-ray fluorescence (XRF)
  - X-ray photoelectron spectroscopy (XPS)
  - X-ray diffraction (XRD)
  - X-ray topography
  - Neutron activation analysis (NAA)
  - Chemical etching

== Future characterization methods ==
Many of these techniques have been perfected for silicon, making it the most studied semiconductor material. This is a result of silicon's affordability and prominent use in computing. As other fields such as power electronics, LED devices, and photovoltaics develop, characterization of a variety of alternative materials (including organic semiconductors) will continue to increase in importance. Many existing characterization methods will need to be adapted to accommodate the peculiarities of these new materials.
