= Gadolinium phosphate =

Names
- Other names Gadolinium orthophosphate

Identifiers
| CAS Number | 13628-51-8 |
| 3D model (JSmol) | Interactive image |
| ChemSpider | 8035507 |
| ECHA InfoCard | 100.033.724 |
| EC Number | 237-112-6 |
| PubChem CID | 9859808 |
| CompTox Dashboard (EPA) | DTXSID50159754 |
- InChI: InChI=1S/Gd.H3O4P/c;1-5(2,3)4/h;(H3,1,2,3,4)/q+3;/p-3 Key: JAOZQVJVXQKQAD-UHFFFAOYSA-K
- SMILES: [O-]P(=O)([O-])[O-].[Gd+3]

Properties
| Chemical formula | GdPO_{4} |
| Molar mass | 252.22 g/mol |
| Appearance | White solid |
| Solubility in water | Very slightly soluble in water |
- Except where otherwise noted, data are given for materials in their standard state (at 25 °C [77 °F], 100 kPa). Infobox references

Gadolinium phosphate is an inorganic compound of gadolinium and phosphate with the chemical formula GdPO_{4}. Both hydrated and anhydrous forms are known. The compound is notable for its very low solubility and high neutron absorption associated with gadolinium.

== Structure and properties ==
Anhydrous gadolinium phosphate can occur in both monazite-type and xenotime-type structures. The monazite form is monoclinic, space group P2_{1}/n, whereas the xenotime form is tetragonal and isostructural with zircon, space group I4_{1}/amd.

In monazite-type GdPO_{4}, isolated PO_{4} tetrahedra are linked through irregular GdO_{9} coordination polyhedra.

GdPO_{4} lies close to the structural boundary between the monazite-type light rare-earth phosphates and the xenotime-type heavy rare-earth phosphates. Consequently, both structural forms have been reported under different synthesis and temperature conditions.

Hydrated gadolinium phosphate is extremely insoluble in water. Solubility-product measurements on GdPO_{4}·H_{2}O gave K_{sp} values in the approximate range 2 × 10^{−14} to 5 × 10^{−13}.

== Preparation ==
Hydrated gadolinium phosphate can be prepared by precipitation from solutions containing Gd^{3+} and phosphate ions. For example, reaction of gadolinium(III) chloride with phosphoric acid at low temperature gives hydrated GdPO_{4}.

The product obtained depends on temperature, pH and ageing conditions. Hemihydrate, monohydrate and more highly hydrated forms have been reported.

Calcination of hydrated GdPO_{4} at about 800–1000 °C produces anhydrous material with the monazite structure.

== Applications ==
Because naturally occurring gadolinium has a very high thermal-neutron absorption cross section, GdPO_{4} has been investigated as a chemically durable neutron absorber. Its low aqueous solubility and thermal stability have led to study of the material for incorporation into systems used for storage or disposal of spent nuclear fuel.

Gadolinium phosphate is also used as a host material for luminescent rare-earth ions. Solid solutions based on LaPO_{4}–GdPO_{4}, doped with ions such as Sm^{3+}, have been investigated as phosphors for white-light-emitting devices.
