= Phosphor =

Luminescent substance

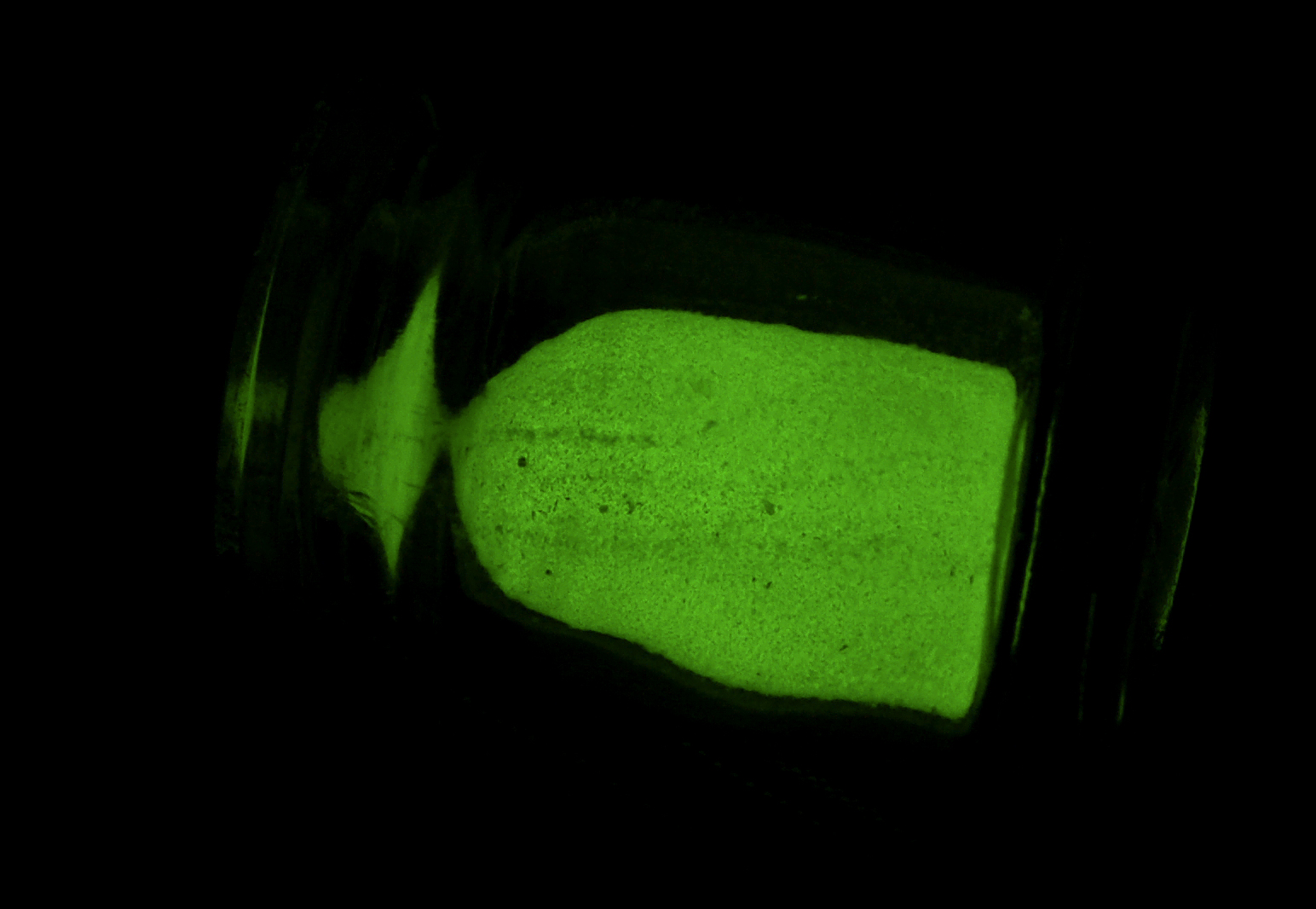
Example of phosphorescence

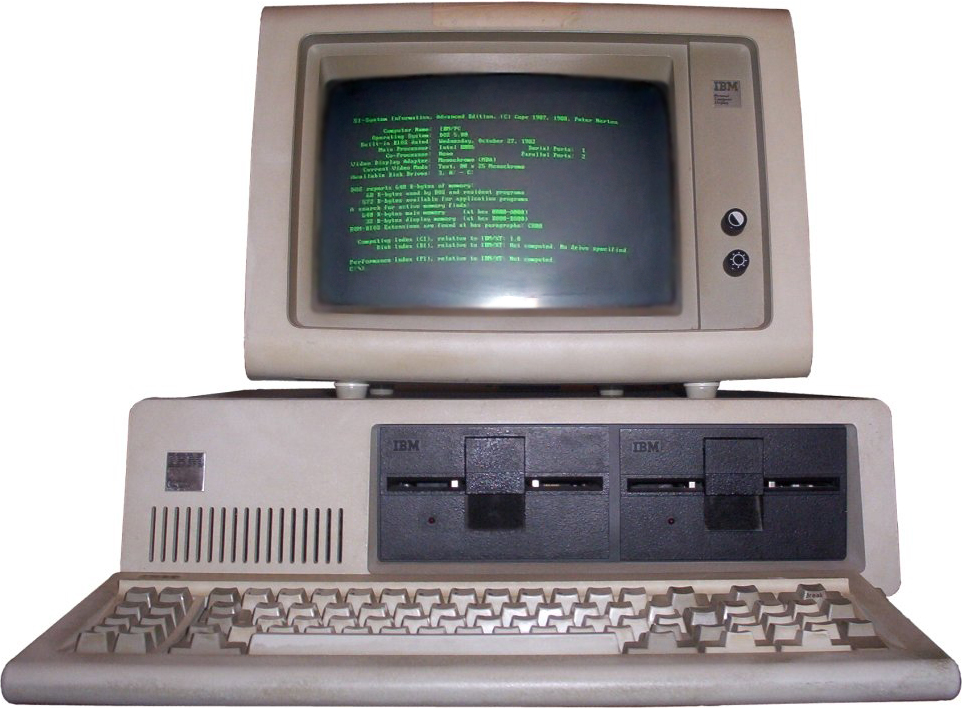
Monochrome monitor

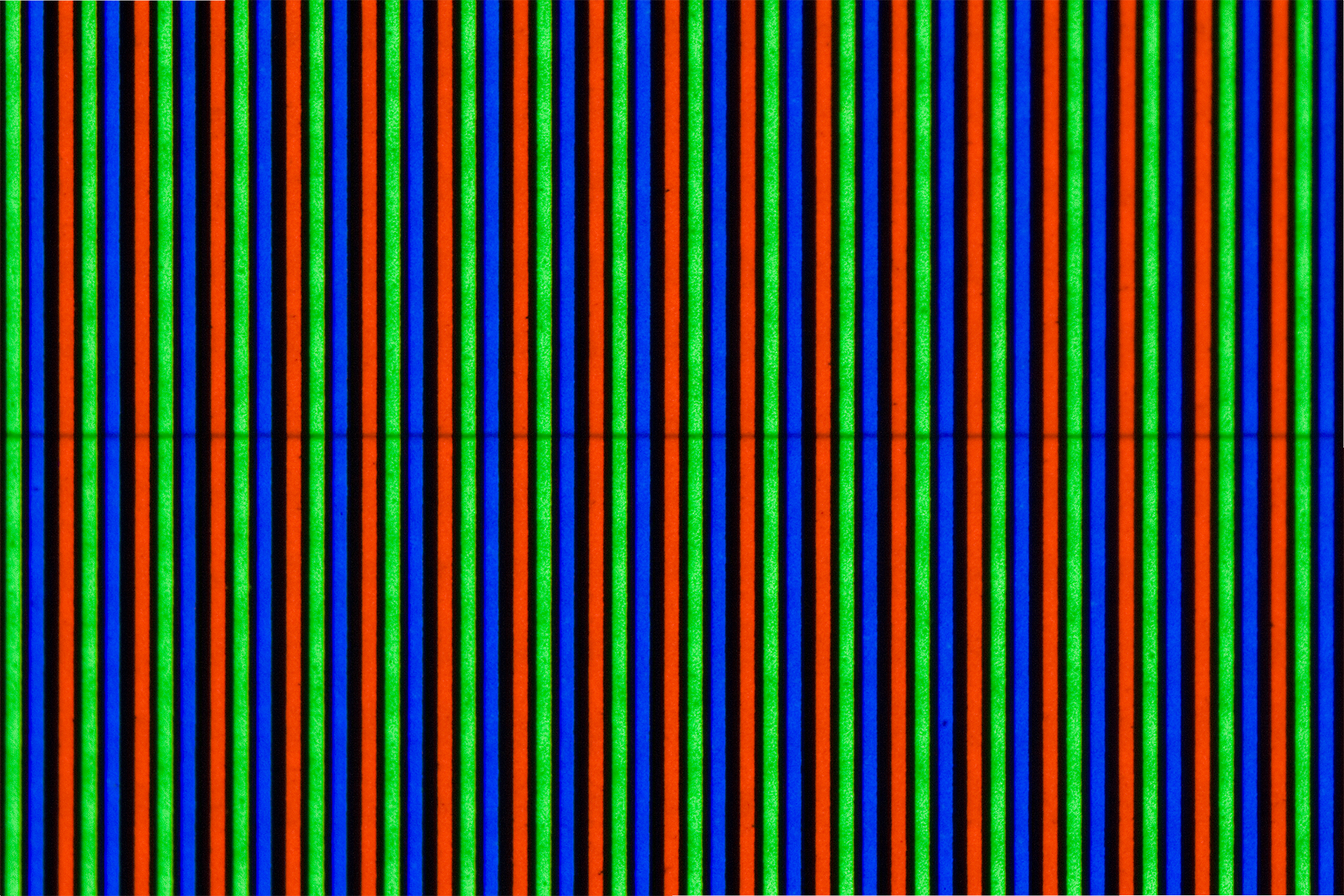
Aperture grille CRT phosphors

A phosphor is a substance that exhibits the phenomenon of luminescence; it emits light when exposed to some type of radiant energy. The term is used both for fluorescent or phosphorescent substances which glow on exposure to ultraviolet or visible light, and cathodoluminescent substances which glow when struck by an electron beam (cathode rays) in a cathode-ray tube.

When a phosphor is exposed to radiation, the orbital electrons in its molecules are excited to a higher energy level; when they return to their former level they emit the energy as light of a certain color. Phosphors can be classified into two categories: fluorescent substances which emit the energy immediately and stop glowing when the exciting radiation is turned off, and phosphorescent substances which emit the energy after a delay, so they keep glowing after the radiation is turned off, decaying in brightness over a period of milliseconds to days.

Fluorescent materials are used in applications in which the phosphor is excited continuously: cathode-ray tubes (CRT) and plasma video display screens, fluoroscope screens, fluorescent lights, scintillation sensors, most white LEDs, and luminous paints for black light art. Phosphorescent materials are used where a persistent light is needed, such as glow-in-the-dark watch faces and aircraft instruments, and in radar screens to allow the target 'blips' to remain visible as the radar beam rotates. CRT phosphors were standardized beginning around World War II and designated by the letter "P" followed by a number.

Phosphorus, the light-emitting chemical element for which phosphors are named, emits light due to chemiluminescence, not phosphorescence.

== Light-emission process ==
Jablonski diagram shows the energy levels in a fluorescing atom in a phosphor. An electron in the phosphor absorbs a high-energy photon from the applied radiation, exciting it to a higher energy level. After losing some energy in non-radiative transitions, it eventually transitions back to its ground state energy level by fluorescence, emitting a photon of lower energy in the visible light region.

The scintillation process in inorganic materials is due to the electronic band structure found in the crystals. An incoming particle can excite an electron from the valence band to either the conduction band or the exciton band (located just below the conduction band and separated from the valence band by an energy gap). This leaves an associated hole behind, in the valence band. Impurities create electronic levels in the forbidden gap.

The excitons are loosely bound electron–hole pairs that wander through the crystal lattice until they are captured as a whole by impurity centers. They then rapidly de-excite by emitting scintillation light (fast component).

In the conduction band, electrons are independent of their associated holes. Those electrons and holes are captured successively by impurity centers exciting certain metastable states not accessible to the excitons. The delayed de-excitation of those metastable impurity states, slowed by reliance on the low-probability forbidden mechanism, again results in light emission (slow component). In the case of inorganic scintillators, the activator impurities are typically chosen so that the emitted light is in the visible range or near-UV, where photomultipliers are effective.

Phosphors are often transition-metal compounds or rare-earth compounds of various types. In inorganic phosphors, these inhomogeneities in the crystal structure are created usually by addition of a trace amount of dopants, impurities called activators. (In rare cases dislocations or other crystal defects can play the role of the impurity.) The wavelength emitted by the emission center is dependent on the atom itself and on the surrounding crystal structure.

== Materials ==
Phosphors are usually made from a suitable host material with an added activator. The best known type is a copper-activated zinc sulfide (ZnS) and the silver-activated zinc sulfide (zinc sulfide silver).

The host materials are typically oxides, nitrides and oxynitrides, sulfides, selenides, halides or silicates of zinc, cadmium, manganese, aluminium, silicon, or various rare-earth metals. The activators prolong the emission time (afterglow). In turn, other materials (such as nickel) can be used to quench the afterglow and shorten the decay part of the phosphor emission characteristics.

Many phosphor powders are produced in low-temperature processes, such as sol-gel, and usually require post-annealing at temperatures of ~1000 °C, which is undesirable for many applications. However, proper optimization of the growth process allows manufacturers to avoid the annealing.

Phosphors used for fluorescent lamps require a multi-step production process, with details that vary depending on the particular phosphor. Bulk material must be milled to obtain a desired particle size range, since large particles produce a poor-quality lamp coating, and small particles produce less light and degrade more quickly. During the firing of the phosphor, process conditions must be controlled to prevent oxidation of the phosphor activators or contamination from the process vessels. After milling, the phosphor may be washed to remove minor excess of activator elements. Volatile elements must not be allowed to escape during processing. Lamp manufacturers have changed compositions of phosphors to eliminate some toxic elements formerly used, such as beryllium, cadmium, or thallium.

The commonly quoted parameters for phosphors are the wavelength of emission maximum (in nanometers, or alternatively color temperature in kelvins for white blends), the peak width (in nanometers at 50% of intensity), and decay time (in seconds).

Examples:

- Calcium sulfide with strontium sulfide with bismuth as activator, (Ca,Sr)S:Bi, yields blue light with glow times up to 12 hours, red and orange are modifications of the zinc sulfide formula. Red color can be obtained from strontium sulfide.
- Zinc sulfide with about 5 ppm of a copper activator is the most common phosphor for the glow-in-the-dark toys and items. It is also called GS phosphor.
- Mix of zinc sulfide and cadmium sulfide emit color depending on their ratio; increasing of the CdS content shifts the output color towards longer wavelengths; its persistence ranges between 1–10 hours.
- Strontium aluminate activated by europium or dysprosium, SrAl_{2}O_{4}:Eu(II):Dy(III), is a material developed in 1993 by Nemoto & Co. engineer Yasumitsu Aoki with higher brightness and significantly longer glow persistence; it produces green and aqua hues, where green gives the highest brightness and aqua the longest glow time. SrAl_{2}O_{4}:Eu:Dy is about 10 times brighter, 10 times longer glowing, and 10 times more expensive than ZnS:Cu. The excitation wavelengths for strontium aluminate range from 200 to 450 nm. The wavelength for its green formulation is 520 nm, its blue-green version emits at 505 nm, and the blue one emits at 490 nm. Colors with longer wavelengths can be obtained from the strontium aluminate as well, though for the price of some loss of brightness.

== Phosphor degradation ==
Many phosphors tend to lose efficiency gradually by several mechanisms. The activators can undergo change of valence (usually oxidation), the crystal lattice degrades, atoms – often the activators – diffuse through the material, the surface undergoes chemical reactions with the environment with consequent loss of efficiency or buildup of a layer absorbing the exciting and/or radiated energy, etc.

The degradation of electroluminescent devices depends on frequency of driving current, the luminance level, and temperature; moisture impairs phosphor lifetime very noticeably as well.

Harder, high-melting, water-insoluble materials display lower tendency to lose luminescence under operation.

Examples:

- BaMgAl_{10}O_{17}:Eu^{2+} (BAM), a plasma-display phosphor, undergoes oxidation of the dopant during baking. Three mechanisms are involved; absorption of oxygen atoms into oxygen vacancies on the crystal surface, diffusion of Eu(II) along the conductive layer, and electron transfer from Eu(II) to absorbed oxygen atoms, leading to formation of Eu(III) with corresponding loss of emissivity. Thin coating of aluminium phosphate or lanthanum(III) phosphate is effective in creating a barrier layer blocking access of oxygen to the BAM phosphor, for the cost of reduction of phosphor efficiency. Addition of hydrogen, acting as a reducing agent, to argon in the plasma displays significantly extends the lifetime of BAM:Eu^{2+} phosphor, by reducing the Eu(III) atoms back to Eu(II).
- Y_{2}O_{3}:Eu phosphors under electron bombardment in presence of oxygen form a non-phosphorescent layer on the surface, where electron–hole pairs recombine nonradiatively via surface states.
- ZnS:Mn, used in AC thin-film electroluminescent (ACTFEL) devices degrades mainly due to formation of deep-level traps, by reaction of water molecules with the dopant; the traps act as centers for nonradiative recombination. The traps also damage the crystal lattice. Phosphor aging leads to decreased brightness and elevated threshold voltage.
- ZnS-based phosphors in CRTs and FEDs degrade by surface excitation, coulombic damage, build-up of electric charge, and thermal quenching. Electron-stimulated reactions of the surface are directly correlated to loss of brightness. The electrons dissociate impurities in the environment, the reactive oxygen species then attack the surface and form carbon monoxide and carbon dioxide with traces of carbon, and nonradiative zinc oxide and zinc sulfate on the surface; the reactive hydrogen removes sulfur from the surface as hydrogen sulfide, forming nonradiative layer of metallic zinc. Sulfur can be also removed as sulfur oxides.
- ZnS and CdS phosphors degrade by reduction of the metal ions by captured electrons. The M^{2+} ions are reduced to M^{+}; two M^{+} then exchange an electron and become one M^{2+} and one neutral M atom. The reduced metal can be observed as a visible darkening of the phosphor layer. The darkening (and the brightness loss) is proportional to the phosphor's exposure to electrons and can be observed on some CRT screens that displayed the same image (e.g. a terminal login screen) for prolonged periods.
- Europium(II)-doped alkaline earth aluminates degrade by formation of color centers.
- Y_{2}SiO_{5}:Ce^{3+} degrades by loss of luminescent Ce^{3+} ions.
- Zn_{2}SiO_{4}:Mn (P1) degrades by desorption of oxygen under electron bombardment.
- Oxide phosphors can degrade rapidly in presence of fluoride ions, remaining from incomplete removal of flux from phosphor synthesis.
- Loosely packed phosphors, e.g. when an excess of silica gel (formed from the potassium silicate binder) is present, have tendency to locally overheat due to poor thermal conductivity. E.g. InBO_{3}:Tb^{3+} is subject to accelerated degradation at higher temperatures.

== Applications ==
=== Lighting ===
Phosphor layers provide most of the light produced by fluorescent lamps, and are also used to improve the balance of light produced by metal halide lamps. Various neon signs use phosphor layers to produce different colors of light. Electroluminescent displays found, for example, in aircraft instrument panels, use a phosphor layer to produce glare-free illumination or as numeric and graphic display devices. Most white LED lamps consist of a blue or ultra-violet emitter with a phosphor coating that emits at longer wavelengths, giving a full spectrum of visible light. Unfocused and undeflected cathode-ray tubes have been used as stroboscope lamps since 1958.

=== Phosphor thermometry ===
Phosphor thermometry is a temperature measurement approach that uses the temperature dependence of certain phosphors. For this, a phosphor coating is applied to a surface of interest and, usually, the decay time is the emission parameter that indicates temperature. Because the illumination and detection optics can be situated remotely, the method may be used for moving surfaces such as high speed motor surfaces. Also, phosphor may be applied to the end of an optical fiber as an optical analog of a thermocouple.

=== Glow-in-the-dark toys ===
In these applications, the phosphor is directly added to the plastic used to mold the toys, or mixed with a binder for use as paints.

ZnS:Cu phosphor is used in glow-in-the-dark cosmetic creams frequently used for Halloween make-ups. Generally, the persistence of the phosphor increases as the wavelength increases. See also lightstick for chemiluminescence-based glowing items.

=== Oxygen sensing ===
Quenching of the triplet state by O_{2} (which has a triplet ground state) as a result of Dexter energy transfer is well known in solutions of phosphorescent heavy-metal complexes and doped polymers. In recent years, phosphorescence porous materials(such as Metal–organic frameworks and Covalent organic frameworks) have shown promising oxygen sensing capabilities, for their non-linear gas-adsorption in ultra-low partial pressures of oxygen.

=== Postage stamps ===
Phosphor banded stamps first appeared in 1959 as guides for machines to sort mail. Around the world many varieties exist with different amounts of banding. Postage stamps are sometimes collected by whether or not they are "tagged" with phosphor (or printed on luminescent paper).

=== Radioluminescence ===
Zinc sulfide phosphors are used with radioactive materials, where the phosphor was excited by the alpha- and beta-decaying isotopes, to create luminescent paint for dials of watches and instruments (radium dials). Between 1913 and 1950 radium-228 and radium-226 were used to activate a phosphor made of silver doped zinc sulfide (ZnS:Ag), which gave a greenish glow. The phosphor is not suitable to be used in layers thicker than 25 mg/cm^{2}, as the self-absorption of the light then becomes a problem. Furthermore, zinc sulfide undergoes degradation of its crystal lattice structure, leading to gradual loss of brightness significantly faster than the depletion of radium. ZnS:Ag coated spinthariscope screens were used by Ernest Rutherford in his experiments discovering atomic nucleus.

Copper doped zinc sulfide (ZnS:Cu) is the most common phosphor used and yields blue-green light. Copper and magnesium doped zinc sulfide (ZnS:Cu,Mg) yields yellow-orange light.

Tritium is also used as a source of radiation in various products utilizing tritium illumination.

=== Electroluminescence ===
Electroluminescence can be exploited in light sources. Such sources typically emit from a large area, which makes them suitable for backlights of LCD displays. The excitation of the phosphor is usually achieved by application of high-intensity electric field, usually with suitable frequency. Current electroluminescent light sources tend to degrade with use, resulting in their relatively short operation lifetimes.

ZnS:Cu was the first formulation successfully displaying electroluminescence, tested at 1936 by Georges Destriau in Madame Marie Curie laboratories in Paris.

Powder or AC electroluminescence is found in a variety of backlight and night light applications. Several groups offer branded EL offerings (e.g. IndiGlo used in some Timex watches) or "Lighttape", another trade name of an electroluminescent material, used in electroluminescent light strips. The Apollo space program is often credited with being the first significant use of EL for backlights and lighting.

=== White LEDs ===
White light-emitting diodes are usually blue InGaN LEDs with a coating of a suitable material. Cerium(III)-doped YAG (YAG:Ce^{3+}, or Y_{3}Al_{5}O_{12}:Ce^{3+}) is often used; it absorbs the light from the blue LED and emits in a broad range from greenish to reddish, with most of its output in yellow. This yellow emission combined with the remaining blue emission gives the "white" light, which can be adjusted to color temperature as warm (yellowish) or cold (bluish) white. The pale yellow emission of the Ce^{3+}:YAG can be tuned by substituting the cerium with other rare-earth elements such as terbium and gadolinium and can even be further adjusted by substituting some or all of the aluminium in the YAG with gallium. However, this process is not one of phosphorescence. The yellow light is produced by a process known as scintillation, the complete absence of an afterglow being one of the characteristics of the process.

Some rare-earth-doped Sialons are photoluminescent and can serve as phosphors. Europium(II)-doped β-SiAlON absorbs in ultraviolet and visible light spectrum and emits intense broadband visible emission. Its luminance and color does not change significantly with temperature, due to the temperature-stable crystal structure. It has a great potential as a green down-conversion phosphor for white LEDs; a yellow variant also exists (α-SiAlON). For white LEDs, a blue LED is used with a yellow phosphor, or with a green and yellow SiAlON phosphor and a red CaAlSiN_{3}-based (CASN) phosphor.

White LEDs can also be made by coating near-ultraviolet-emitting LEDs with a mixture of high-efficiency europium-based red- and blue-emitting phosphors plus green-emitting copper- and aluminium-doped zinc sulfide (ZnS:Cu,Al). This is a method analogous to the way fluorescent lamps work.

Some newer white LEDs use a yellow and blue emitter in series, to approximate white; this technology is used in some Motorola phones such as the Blackberry as well as LED lighting and the original-version stacked emitters by using GaN on SiC on InGaP but was later found to fracture at higher drive currents.

Many white LEDs used in general lighting systems can be used for data transfer, as, for example, in systems that modulate the LED to act as a beacon.

It is also common for white LEDs to use phosphors other than Ce:YAG, or to use two or three phosphors to achieve a higher CRI, often at the cost of efficiency. Examples of additional phosphors are R9, which produces a saturated red, nitrides which produce red, and aluminates such as lutetium aluminum garnet that produce green. Silicate phosphors are brighter but fade more quickly, and are used in LCD LED backlights in mobile devices. LED phosphors can be placed directly over the die or made into a dome and placed above the LED: this approach is known as a remote phosphor. Some colored LEDs, instead of using a colored LED, use a blue LED with a colored phosphor because such an arrangement is more efficient than a colored LED. Oxynitride phosphors can also be used in LEDs. The precursors used to make the phosphors may degrade when exposed to air.

=== Cathode-ray tubes ===
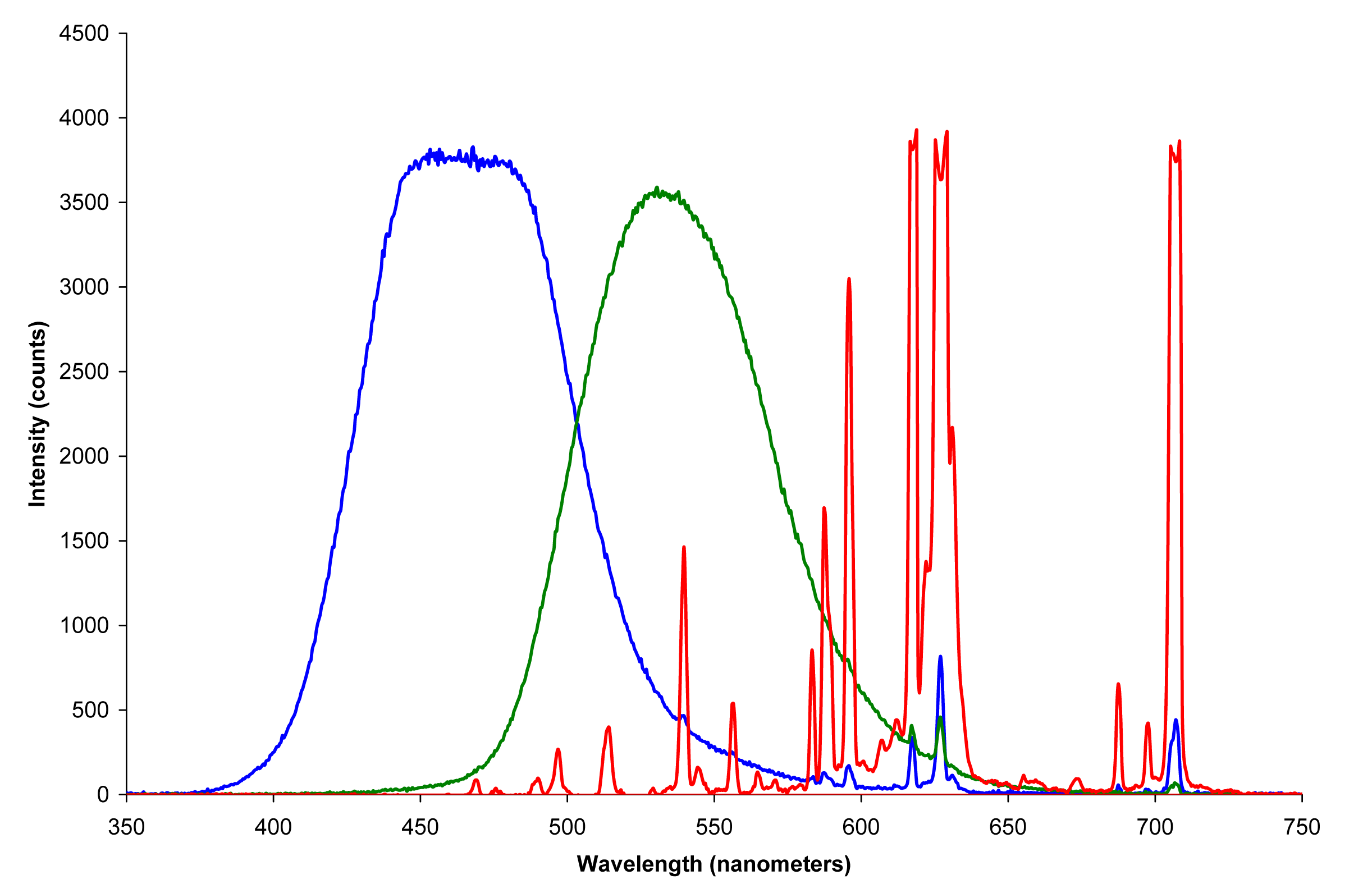
Spectra of constituent blue, green and red phosphors in a common cathode-ray tube

Cathode-ray tubes produce signal-generated light patterns in a (typically) round or rectangular format. Bulky CRTs were used in the black-and-white television (TV) sets that became popular in the 1950s, developed into color CRTs in the late 1960s, and used in virtually all color TVs and computer monitors until the mid-2000s. In the late 20th century, advanced electronics made new wide-deflection, "short tube" CRT technology viable, making CRTs more compact, but still bulky and heavy. As the original video display technology, having no viable competition for more than 40 years and dominance for over 50 years, the CRT ceased to be the main type of video display in use only around 2010. In addition to direct-view CRTs, CRT projection tubes were the basis of all projection TVs and most computer video projectors of both front and rear projection types until at least the late 1990s.

CRTs have also been widely used in scientific and engineering instrumentation, such as oscilloscopes, usually with a single phosphor color, typically green. Phosphors for such applications may have long afterglow, for increased image persistence. A variation of the display CRT, used prior to the 1980s, was the CRT storage tube, a digital memory device which (in later forms) also provided a visible display of the stored data, using a variation of the same electron-beam excited phosphor technology.

The process of producing light in CRTs by electron-beam excited phosphorescence yields much faster signal response times than even modern (2020s) LCDs can achieve, which makes light pens and light gun games possible with CRTs, but not LCDs. Also in contrast to most other video display types, because CRT technology draws an image by scanning an electron beam (or a formation of three beams) across a phosphor surface, a CRT has no intrinsic "native resolution" and does not require scaling to display raster images at different resolutions; the CRT can display any raster format natively, within the limits defined by the electron beam spot size and, for a color CRT, the dot pitch of the phosphor. Because of this operating principle, CRTs can produce images using either raster and vector imaging methods. Vector displays are impossible for display technologies that have permanent discrete pixels, including all LCDs, plasma display panels, DMD projectors, and OLED (LED matrix, e.g. TFT OLED) panels.

The phosphors can be deposited as either thin film, or as discrete particles, a powder bound to the surface. Thin films have better lifetime and better resolution, but provide less bright and less efficient image than powder ones. This is caused by multiple internal reflections in the thin film, scattering the emitted light.

White (in black-and-white): The mix of zinc cadmium sulfide and zinc sulfide silver, the ZnS:Ag + (Zn,Cd)S:Ag is the white P4 phosphor used in black and white television CRTs. Mixes of yellow and blue phosphors are usual. Mixes of red, green and blue, or a single white phosphor, can also be encountered.

Red: Yttrium oxide-sulfide activated with europium is used as the red phosphor in color CRTs. The development of color TV took a long time due to the search for a red phosphor. The first red emitting rare-earth phosphor, YVO_{4}:Eu^{3+}, was introduced by Levine and Palilla as a primary color in television in 1964. In single crystal form, it was used as an excellent polarizer and laser material.

Yellow: When mixed with cadmium sulfide, the resulting zinc cadmium sulfide (Zn,Cd)S:Ag, provides strong yellow light.

Green: Combination of zinc sulfide with copper, the P31 phosphor or ZnS:Cu, provides green light peaking at 531 nm, with long glow.

Blue: Combination of zinc sulfide with few ppm of silver, the ZnS:Ag, when excited by electrons, provides strong blue glow with maximum at 450 nm, with short afterglow with 200 nanosecond duration. It is known as the P22B phosphor. This material, zinc sulfide silver, is still one of the most efficient phosphors in cathode-ray tubes. It is used as a blue phosphor in color CRTs.

The phosphors are usually poor electrical conductors. This may lead to deposition of residual charge on the screen, effectively decreasing the energy of the impacting electrons due to electrostatic repulsion (an effect known as "sticking"). To eliminate this, a thin layer of aluminium (about 100 nm) is deposited over the phosphors, usually by vacuum evaporation, and connected to the conductive layer inside the tube. This layer also reflects the phosphor light to the desired direction, and protects the phosphor from ion bombardment resulting from an imperfect vacuum.

To reduce the image degradation by reflection of ambient light, contrast can be increased by several methods. In addition to black masking of unused areas of screen, the phosphor particles in color screens are coated with pigments of matching color. For example, the red phosphors are coated with ferric oxide (replacing earlier Cd(S,Se) due to cadmium toxicity), blue phosphors can be coated with marine blue (CoO·nAl_{2}O_{3}) or ultramarine (Na_{8}Al_{6}Si_{6}O_{24}S_{2}). Green phosphors based on ZnS:Cu do not have to be coated due to their own yellowish color.

==== Black-and-white television CRTs ====
The black-and-white television screens require an emission color close to white. Usually, a combination of phosphors is employed.

The most common combination is ZnS:Ag + (Zn,Cd)S:Cu,Al (blue + yellow). Other ones are ZnS:Ag + (Zn,Cd)S:Ag (blue + yellow), and ZnS:Ag + ZnS:Cu,Al + Y_{2}O_{2}S:Eu^{3+} (blue + green + red – does not contain cadmium and has poor efficiency). The color tone can be adjusted by the ratios of the components.

As the compositions contain discrete grains of different phosphors, they produce image that may not be entirely smooth. A single, white-emitting phosphor, (Zn,Cd)S:Ag,Au,Al overcomes this obstacle. Due to its low efficiency, it is used only on very small screens.

The screens are typically covered with phosphor using sedimentation coating, where particles suspended in a solution are let to settle on the surface.

==== Reduced-palette color CRTs ====
For displaying of a limited palette of colors, there are a few options.

In beam penetration tubes, different color phosphors are layered and separated with dielectric material. The acceleration voltage is used to determine the energy of the electrons; lower-energy ones are absorbed in the top layer of the phosphor, while some of the higher-energy ones shoot through and are absorbed in the lower layer. So either the first color or a mixture of the first and second color is shown. With a display with red outer layer and green inner layer, the manipulation of accelerating voltage can produce a continuum of colors from red through orange and yellow to green.

Another method is using a mixture of two phosphors with different characteristics. The brightness of one is linearly dependent on electron flux, while the other one's brightness saturates at higher fluxes—the phosphor does not emit any more light regardless of how many more electrons impact it. At low electron flux, both phosphors emit together; at higher fluxes, the luminous contribution of the nonsaturating phosphor prevails, changing the combined color.

Such displays can have high resolution, due to absence of two-dimensional structuring of RGB CRT phosphors. Their color palette is, however, very limited. They were used e.g. in some older military radar displays.

==== Color television CRTs ====
The phosphors in color CRTs need higher contrast and resolution than the black-and-white ones. The energy density of the electron beam is about 100 times greater than in black-and-white CRTs; the electron spot is focused to about 0.2 mm diameter instead of about 0.6 mm diameter of the black-and-white CRTs. Effects related to electron irradiation degradation are therefore more pronounced.

Color CRTs require three different phosphors, emitting in red, green and blue, patterned on the screen. Three separate electron guns are used for color production (except for displays that use beam-index tube technology, which is rare). The red phosphor has always been a problem, being the dimmest of the three necessitating the brighter green and blue electron beam currents be adjusted down to make them equal the red phosphor's lower brightness. This made early color TVs only usable indoors as bright light made it impossible to see the dim picture, while portable black-and-white TVs viewable in outdoor sunlight were already common.

The composition of the phosphors changed over time, as better phosphors were developed and as environmental concerns led to lowering the content of cadmium and later abandoning it entirely. The (Zn,Cd)S:Ag,Cl was replaced with (Zn,Cd)S:Cu,Al with lower cadmium/zinc ratio, and then with cadmium-free ZnS:Cu,Al.

The blue phosphor stayed generally unchanged, a silver-doped zinc sulfide. The green phosphor initially used manganese-doped zinc silicate, then evolved through silver-activated cadmium-zinc sulfide, to lower-cadmium copper-aluminium activated formula, and then to cadmium-free version of the same. The red phosphor saw the most changes; it was originally manganese-activated zinc phosphate, then a silver-activated cadmium-zinc sulfide, then the europium(III) activated phosphors appeared; first in an yttrium vanadate matrix, then in yttrium oxide and currently in yttrium oxysulfide. The evolution of the phosphors was therefore (ordered by B-G-R):

- ZnS:Ag – Zn_{2}SiO_{4}:Mn – Zn_{3}(PO_{4})_{2}:Mn
- ZnS:Ag – (Zn,Cd)S:Ag – (Zn,Cd)S:Ag
- ZnS:Ag – (Zn,Cd)S:Ag – YVO_{4}:Eu^{3+} (1964–?)
- ZnS:Ag – (Zn,Cd)S:Cu,Al – Y_{2}O_{2}S:Eu^{3+} or Y_{2}O_{3}:Eu^{3+}
- ZnS:Ag – ZnS:Cu,Al or ZnS:Au,Cu,Al – Y_{2}O_{2}S:Eu^{3+}

==== Projection televisions ====
For projection televisions, where the beam power density can be two orders of magnitude higher than in conventional CRTs, some different phosphors have to be used.

For blue color, ZnS:Ag,Cl is employed. However, it saturates. (La,Gd)OBr:Ce,Tb^{3+} can be used as an alternative that is more linear at high energy densities.

For green, a terbium-activated Gd_{2}O_{2}Tb^{3+}; its color purity and brightness at low excitation densities is worse than the zinc sulfide alternative, but it behaves linear at high excitation energy densities, while zinc sulfide saturates. However, it also saturates, so Y_{3}Al_{5}O_{12}:Tb^{3+} or Y_{2}SiO_{5}:Tb^{3+} can be substituted. LaOBr:Tb^{3+} is bright but water-sensitive, degradation-prone, and the plate-like morphology of its crystals hampers its use; these problems are solved now, so it is gaining use due to its higher linearity.

Y_{2}O_{2}S:Eu^{3+} is used for red emission.

== Standard phosphor types ==
Standard phosphor types
Phosphor	Composition	Color	Wavelength	Peak width	Persistence	Usage	Notes
P1, GJ	Zn_{2}SiO_{4}:Mn (Willemite)	Green	525 nm	40 nm	1-100ms	CRT, Lamp	Oscilloscopes and monochrome monitors
P2	ZnS:Cu(Ag)(B*)	Blue-Green	543 nm	–	Long	CRT	Oscilloscopes
P3	Zn_{8}:BeSi_{5}O_{19}:Mn	Yellow	602 nm	–	Medium/13 ms	CRT	Amber monochrome monitors
P4	ZnS:Ag+(Zn,Cd)S:Ag	White	565,540 nm	–	Short	CRT	Black and white TV CRTs and display tubes.
P4 (Cd-free)	ZnS:Ag+ZnS:Cu+Y_{2}O_{2}S:Eu	White	–	–	Short	CRT	Black and white TV CRTs and display tubes, Cd free.
P5	CaWO_{4}:W	Blue	430 nm	–	Very Short	CRT	Film
P6	ZnS:Ag+ZnS:CdS:Ag	White	565,460 nm	–	Short	CRT	
P7	(Zn,Cd)S:Cu	Blue with Yellow persistence	558,440 nm	–	Long	CRT	Radar PPI, old EKG monitors, early oscilloscopes
P10	KCl	Green-absorbing scotophor	–	–	Long	Dark-trace CRTs	Radar screens; turns from translucent white to dark magenta, stays changed until erased by heating or infrared light
P11, BE	ZnS:Ag,Cl or ZnS:Zn	Blue	460 nm	–	0.01-1 ms	CRT, VFD	Display tubes and VFDs; Oscilloscopes (for fast photographic recording)
P12	Zn(Mg)F_{2}:Mn	Orange	590 nm	–	Medium/long	CRT	Radar
P13	MgSi_{2}O_{6}:Mn	Reddish-Orange	640 nm	–	Medium	CRT	Flying spot scanning systems and photographic applications
P14	ZnS:Ag on ZnS:CdS:Cu	Blue with Orange persistence	–	–	Medium/long	CRT	Radar PPI, old EKG monitors
P15	ZnO:Zn	Blue-Green	504,391 nm	–	Extremely Short	CRT	Television pickup by flying-spot scanning
P16	CaMgSi_{2}O_{6}:Ce	Blue-Purple	380 nm	–	Very Short	CRT	Flying spot scanning systems and photographic applications
P17	ZnO,ZnCdS:Cu	Blue-Yellow	504,391 nm	–	Blue-Short, Yellow-Long	CRT	
P18	CaMgSi_{2}O_{6}:Ti, BeSi_{2}O_{6}:Mn	White	545,405 nm	–	Medium to Short	CRT	
P19, LF	(KF,MgF_{2}):Mn	Orange-Yellow	590 nm	–	Long	CRT	Radar screens
P20, KA	(Zn,Cd)S:Ag or (Zn,Cd)S:Cu	Yellow-Green	555 nm	–	1–100 ms	CRT	Display tubes
P21	MgF_{2}:Mn^{2+}	Reddish	605 nm	–	–	CRT, Radar	Registered by Allen B DuMont Laboratories
P22R	Y_{2}O_{2}S:Eu+Fe_{2}O_{3}	Red	611 nm	–	Short	CRT	Red phosphor for TV screens
P22G	(Zn,Cd)S:Cu,Al	Green	530 nm	–	Short	CRT	Green phosphor for TV screens
P22B	ZnS:Ag+Co-on-Al_{2}O_{3}	Blue	–	–	Short	CRT	Blue phosphor for TV screens
P23	ZnS:Ag+(Zn,Cd)S:Ag	White	575,460 nm	–	Short	CRT, Direct viewing television	Registered by United States Radium Corporation.
P24, GE	ZnO:Zn	Green	505 nm	–	1–10 μs	VFD	most common phosphor in vacuum fluorescent displays.
P25	CaSi_{2}O_{6}:Pb:Mn	Orange	610 nm	–	Medium	CRT	Military Displays - 7UP25 CRT
P26, LC	(KF,MgF_{2}):Mn	Orange	595 nm	–	Long	CRT	Radar screens
P27	ZnPO_{4}:Mn	Reddish Orange	635 nm	–	Medium	CRT	Color TV monitor service
P28, KE	(Zn,Cd)S:Cu,Cl	Yellow	–	–	Medium	CRT	Display tubes
P29	Alternating P2 and P25 stripes	Blue-Green/Orange stripes	–	–	Medium	CRT	Radar screens
P31, GH	ZnS:Cu or ZnS:Cu,Ag	Yellowish-green	–	–	0.01-1 ms	CRT	Oscilloscopes and monochrome monitors
P33, LD	MgF_{2}:Mn	Orange	590 nm	–	> 1sec	CRT	Radar screens
P34	–	Bluish Green-Yellow Green	–	–	Very Long	CRT	–
P35	ZnS,ZnSe:Ag	Blue-White	455 nm	–	Medium Short	CRT	Photographic registration on orthochromatic film materials
P38, LK	(Zn,Mg)F_{2}:Mn	Orange-Yellow	590 nm	–	Long	CRT	Radar screens
P39, GR	Zn_{2}SiO_{4}:Mn,As	Green	525 nm	–	Long	CRT	Display tubes
P40, GA	ZnS:Ag+(Zn,Cd)S:Cu	White	–	–	Long	CRT	Display tubes
P43, GY	Gd_{2}O_{2}S:Tb	Yellow-Green	545 nm	–	Medium	CRT	Display tubes, Electronic Portal Imaging Devices (EPIDs) used in radiation therapy linear accelerators for cancer treatment
P45, WB	Y_{2}O_{2}S:Tb	White	545 nm	–	Short	CRT	Viewfinders
P46, KG	Y_{3}Al_{5}O_{12}:Ce	Green	530 nm	–	Very short (70ns)	CRT	Beam-index tube
P47, BH	Y_{2}SiO_{5}:Ce	Blue	400 nm	–	Very short	CRT	Beam-index tube
P53, KJ	Y_{3}Al_{5}O_{12}:Tb	Yellow-Green	544 nm	–	Short	CRT	Projection tubes
P55, BM	ZnS:Ag,Al	Blue	450 nm	–	Short	CRT	Projection tubes
	ZnS:Ag	Blue	450 nm	–	–	CRT	–
	ZnS:Cu,Al or ZnS:Cu,Au,Al	Green	530 nm	–	–	CRT	–
	(Zn,Cd)S:Cu,Cl+(Zn,Cd)S:Ag,Cl	White	–	–	–	CRT	–
	Y_{2}SiO_{5}:Tb	Green	545 nm	–	–	CRT	Projection tubes
	Y_{2}OS:Tb	Green	545 nm	–	–	CRT	Display tubes
	Y_{3}(Al,Ga)_{5}O_{12}:Ce	Green	520 nm	–	Short	CRT	Beam-index tube
	Y_{3}(Al,Ga)_{5}O_{12}:Tb	Yellow-Green	544 nm	–	Short	CRT	Projection tubes
	InBO_{3}:Tb	Yellow-Green	550 nm	–	–	CRT	–
	InBO_{3}:Eu	Yellow	588 nm	–	–	CRT	–
	InBO_{3}:Tb+InBO_{3}:Eu	amber	–	–	–	CRT	Computer displays
	InBO_{3}:Tb+InBO_{3}:Eu+ZnS:Ag	White	–	–	–	CRT	–
	(Ba,Eu)Mg_{2}Al_{16}O_{27}	Blue	–	–	–	Lamp	Trichromatic fluorescent lamps
	(Ce,Tb)MgAl_{11}O_{19}	Green	546 nm	9 nm	–	Lamp	Trichromatic fluorescent lamps
BAM	BaMgAl_{10}O_{17}:Eu,Mn	Blue	450 nm	–	–	Lamp, displays	Trichromatic fluorescent lamps
	BaMg_{2}Al_{16}O_{27}:Eu(II)	Blue	450 nm	52 nm	–	Lamp	Trichromatic fluorescent lamps
BAM	BaMgAl_{10}O_{17}:Eu,Mn	Blue-Green	456 nm,514 nm	–	–	Lamp	–
	BaMg_{2}Al_{16}O_{27}:Eu(II),Mn(II)	Blue-Green	456 nm, 514 nm	50 nm 50%	–	Lamp	
	Ce_{0.67}Tb_{0.33}MgAl_{11}O_{19}:Ce,Tb	Green	543 nm	–	–	Lamp	Trichromatic fluorescent lamps
	Zn_{2}SiO_{4}:Mn,Sb_{2}O_{3}	Green	528 nm	–	–	Lamp	–
	CaSiO_{3}:Pb,Mn	Orange-Pink	615 nm	83 nm	–	Lamp	
	CaWO_{4} (Scheelite)	Blue	417 nm	–	–	Lamp	–
	CaWO_{4}:Pb	Blue	433 nm/466 nm	111 nm	–	Lamp	Wide bandwidth
	MgWO_{4}	Pale Blue	473 nm	118 nm	–	Lamp	Wide bandwidth, deluxe blend component
	(Sr,Eu,Ba,Ca)_{5}(PO_{4})_{3}Cl	Blue	–	–	–	Lamp	Trichromatic fluorescent lamps
	Sr_{5}Cl(PO_{4})_{3}:Eu(II)	Blue	447 nm	32 nm	–	Lamp	–
	(Ca,Sr,Ba)_{3}(PO_{4})_{2}Cl_{2}:Eu	Blue	452 nm	–	–	Lamp	–
	(Sr,Ca,Ba)_{10}(PO_{4})_{6}Cl_{2}:Eu	Blue	453 nm	–	–	Lamp	Trichromatic fluorescent lamps
	Sr_{2}P_{2}O_{7}:Sn(II)	Blue	460 nm	98 nm	–	Lamp	Wide bandwidth, deluxe blend component
	Sr_{6}P_{5}BO_{20}:Eu	Blue-Green	480 nm	82 nm	–	Lamp	–
	Ca_{5}F(PO_{4})_{3}:Sb	Blue	482 nm	117 nm	–	Lamp	Wide bandwidth
	(Ba,Ti)_{2}P_{2}O_{7}:Ti	Blue-Green	494 nm	143 nm	–	Lamp	Wide bandwidth, deluxe blend component
	3Sr_{3}(PO_{4})_{2}.SrF_{2}:Sb,Mn	Blue	502 nm	–	–	Lamp	–
	Sr_{5}F(PO_{4})_{3}:Sb,Mn	Blue-Green	509 nm	127 nm	–	Lamp	Wide bandwidth
	Sr_{5}F(PO_{4})_{3}:Sb,Mn	Blue-Green	509 nm	127 nm	–	Lamp	Wide bandwidth
	LaPO_{4}:Ce,Tb	Green	544 nm	–	–	Lamp	Trichromatic fluorescent lamps
	(La,Ce,Tb)PO_{4}	Green	–	–	–	Lamp	Trichromatic fluorescent lamps
	(La,Ce,Tb)PO_{4}:Ce,Tb	Green	546 nm	6 nm	–	Lamp	Trichromatic fluorescent lamps
	Ca_{3}(PO_{4})_{2}.CaF_{2}:Ce,Mn	Yellow	568 nm	–	–	Lamp	–
	(Ca,Zn,Mg)_{3}(PO_{4})_{2}:Sn	Orange-Pink	610 nm	146 nm	–	Lamp	Wide bandwidth, blend component
	(Zn,Sr)_{3}(PO_{4})_{2}:Mn	Orange-Red	625 nm	–	–	Lamp	–
	(Sr,Mg)_{3}(PO_{4})_{2}:Sn	Light Orange-Pink	626 nm	120 nm	–	Fluorescent lamps	Wide bandwidth, deluxe blend component
	(Sr,Mg)_{3}(PO_{4})_{2}:Sn(II)	Orange-red	630 nm	–	–	Fluorescent lamps	–
	Ca_{5}F(PO_{4})_{3}:Sb,Mn	3800K	–	–	–	Fluorescent lamps	Lite-white blend
	Ca_{5}(F,Cl)(PO_{4})_{3}:Sb,Mn	White-Cold/Warm	–	–	–	Fluorescent lamps	2600 to 9900 K, for very high output lamps
	(Y,Eu)_{2}O_{3}	Red	–	–	–	Lamp	Trichromatic fluorescent lamps
	Y_{2}O_{3}:Eu(III)	Red	611 nm	4 nm	–	Lamp	Trichromatic fluorescent lamps
	Mg_{4}(F)GeO_{6}:Mn	Red	658 nm	17 nm	–	High-pressure mercury lamps	
	Mg_{4}(F)(Ge,Sn)O_{6}:Mn	Red	658 nm	–	–	Lamp	–
	Y(P,V)O_{4}:Eu	Orange-Red	619 nm	–	–	Lamp	–
	YVO_{4}:Eu	Orange-Red	619 nm	–	–	High Pressure Mercury and Metal Halide Lamps	–
	Y_{2}O_{2}S:Eu	Red	626 nm	–	–	Lamp	–
	3.5 MgO · 0.5 MgF_{2} · GeO_{2} :Mn	Red	655 nm	–	–	Lamp	3.5 MgO · 0.5 MgF_{2} · GeO_{2} :Mn
	Mg_{5}As_{2}O_{11}:Mn	Red	660 nm	–	–	High-pressure mercury lamps, 1960s	–
	SrAl_{2}O_{7}:Pb	Ultraviolet	313 nm	–	–	Special fluorescent lamps for medical use	Ultraviolet
CAM	LaMgAl_{11}O_{19}:Ce	Ultraviolet	340 nm	52 nm	–	Black-light fluorescent lamps	Ultraviolet
LAP	LaPO_{4}:Ce	Ultraviolet	320 nm	38 nm	–	Medical and scientific UV lamps	Ultraviolet
SAC	SrAl_{12}O_{19}:Ce	Ultraviolet	295 nm	34 nm	–	Lamp	Ultraviolet
	SrAl_{11}Si_{0.75}O_{19}:Ce_{0.15}Mn_{0.15}	Green	515 nm	22 nm	–	Lamp	Monochromatic lamps for copiers
BSP	BaSi_{2}O_{5}:Pb	Ultraviolet	350 nm	40 nm	–	Lamp	Ultraviolet
	SrFB_{2}O_{3}:Eu(II)	Ultraviolet	366 nm	–	–	Lamp	Ultraviolet
SBE	SrB_{4}O_{7}:Eu	Ultraviolet	368 nm	15 nm	–	Lamp	Ultraviolet
SMS	Sr_{2}MgSi_{2}O_{7}:Pb	Ultraviolet	365 nm	68 nm	–	Lamp	Ultraviolet
	MgGa_{2}O_{4}:Mn(II)	Blue-Green	–	–	–	Lamp	Black light displays

=== Various ===
Some other phosphors commercially available, for use as X-ray screens, neutron detectors, alpha particle scintillators, etc., are:

Phosphor	Composition	Color	Wavelength	Decay	Afterglow	X-ray absorption	Usage
	Gd_{2}O_{2}S:Eu	Red	627 nm	850 μs	Yes	High	X-ray, neutrons and gamma
	Gd_{2}O_{2}S:Pr	Green	513 nm	4 μs	No	High	X-ray, neutrons and gamma
	Gd_{2}O_{2}S:Pr,Ce,F	Green	513 nm	7 μs	No	High	X-ray, neutrons and gamma
	Y_{2}O_{2}S:Pr	White	513 nm	7 μs	No		Low-energy X-ray
HS	Zn_{0.5}Cd_{0.4}S:Ag	Green	560 nm	80 μs	Yes		Efficient but low-res X-ray
HSr	Zn_{0.4}Cd_{0.6}S:Ag	Red	630 nm	80 μs	Yes		Efficient but low-res X-ray
	CdWO_{4}	Blue	475 nm	28 μs	No		Intensifying phosphor for X-ray and gamma
	CaWO_{4}	Blue	410 nm	20 μs	No		Intensifying phosphor for X-ray and gamma
	MgWO_{4}	White	500 nm	80 μs	No		Intensifying phosphor
YAP	YAlO_{3}:Ce	Blue	370 nm	25 ns	No		For electrons, suitable for photomultipliers
YAG	Y_{3}Al_{5}O_{12}:Ce	Green	550 nm	70 ns	No		For electrons, suitable for photomultipliers
YGG	Y_{3}(Al,Ga)_{5}O_{12}:Ce	Green	530 nm	250 ns	Low		For electrons, suitable for photomultipliers
	CdS:In	Green	525 nm	<1 ns	No		Ultrafast, for electrons
	ZnO:Ga	Blue	390 nm	<5 ns	No		Ultrafast, for electrons
	Anthracene	Blue	447 nm	32 ns	No		For alpha particles and electrons
	plastic (EJ-212)	Blue	400 nm	2.4 ns	No		For alpha particles and electrons
P1	Zn_{2}SiO_{4}:Mn	Green	530 nm	11 ns	Low		For electrons
GS	ZnS:Cu	Green	520 nm	Minutes	Long		For X-rays
	NaI:Tl						For X-ray, alpha, and electrons
	CsI:Tl	Green	545 nm	5 μs	Yes		For X-ray, alpha, and electrons
ND	^{6}LiF/ZnS:Ag	Blue	455 nm	80 μs			For thermal neutrons
NDg	^{6}LiF/ZnS:Cu,Al,Au	Green	565 nm	35 μs			For neutrons
	Cerium doped YAG phosphor	Yellow					

== See also ==
- Cathodoluminescence
- Laser
- Luminophore
- Photoluminescence

== Bibliography ==
- Arunachalam Lakshmanan (2008). Luminescence and Display Phosphors: Phenomena and Applications. Nova Publishers. ISBN 978-1-60456-018-3.
