= Retention time =

Retention time may refer to:

- Retention time (chromatography), the time a compound takes to travel through a chromatography column
- Retention time (DRAM), the duration a memory cell in DRAM can retain data without refresh
- Lake retention time, the mean time that water spends in a lake
