= Variable retention =

Variable retention may refer to:

- Variable retention (silvicultural system), a method of forest management
- Variable retention time, a phenomenon in DRAM memory affecting data retention
