= VRT =

VRT may refer to:

- VRT (broadcaster), Flemish public broadcaster
- V.R. Technology, sometimes called VRT, a famiclone hardware designer from Hsinchu, Taiwan
- Vehicle registration tax (Ireland)
- Vertiv, a critical infrastructure company
- Variable retention time, computer memory issue
- Virtual reality therapy, in medicine
- Volume rendering technique, in computed tomography
- Vrt, Kočevje, village in Slovenia
