= Luminophore =

Atom(s) in a molecule which give it luminescent properties

In chemistry, a luminophore (sometimes shortened to lumophore) is an atom or functional group in a chemical compound that is responsible for its luminescent properties. Luminophores can be either organic or inorganic.

Luminophores can be further classified as fluorophores or phosphors, depending on the nature of the excited state responsible for the emission of photons. However, some luminophores cannot be classified as being exclusively fluorophores or phosphors. Examples include transition-metal complexes such as tris(bipyridine)ruthenium(II) chloride, whose luminescence comes from an excited (nominally triplet) metal-to-ligand charge-transfer (MLCT) state, which is not a true triplet state in the strict sense of the definition; and colloidal quantum dots, whose emissive state does not have either a purely singlet or triplet spin.

Most luminophores consist of conjugated π systems or transition-metal complexes. There are also purely inorganic luminophores, such as zinc sulfide doped with rare-earth metal ions, rare-earth metal oxysulfides doped with other rare-earth metal ions, yttrium oxide doped with rare-earth metal ions, zinc orthosilicate doped with manganese ions, etc. Luminophores can be observed in action in fluorescent lights, television screens, computer monitor screens, organic light-emitting diodes and bioluminescence.

The correct, textbook terminology is luminophore, not lumophore, although the latter term has been frequently used in the chemical literature.

== See also ==
- Chromophore
- Fluorophore
- Phosphor
