= Transient photocurrent =

Measurement technique

Transient photocurrent (TPC) is a measurement technique, typically employed in the physics of thin film semiconductors. TPC allows to study the time-dependent (on a microsecond time scale) extraction of charges generated by photovoltaic effect in semiconductor devices, such as solar cells.

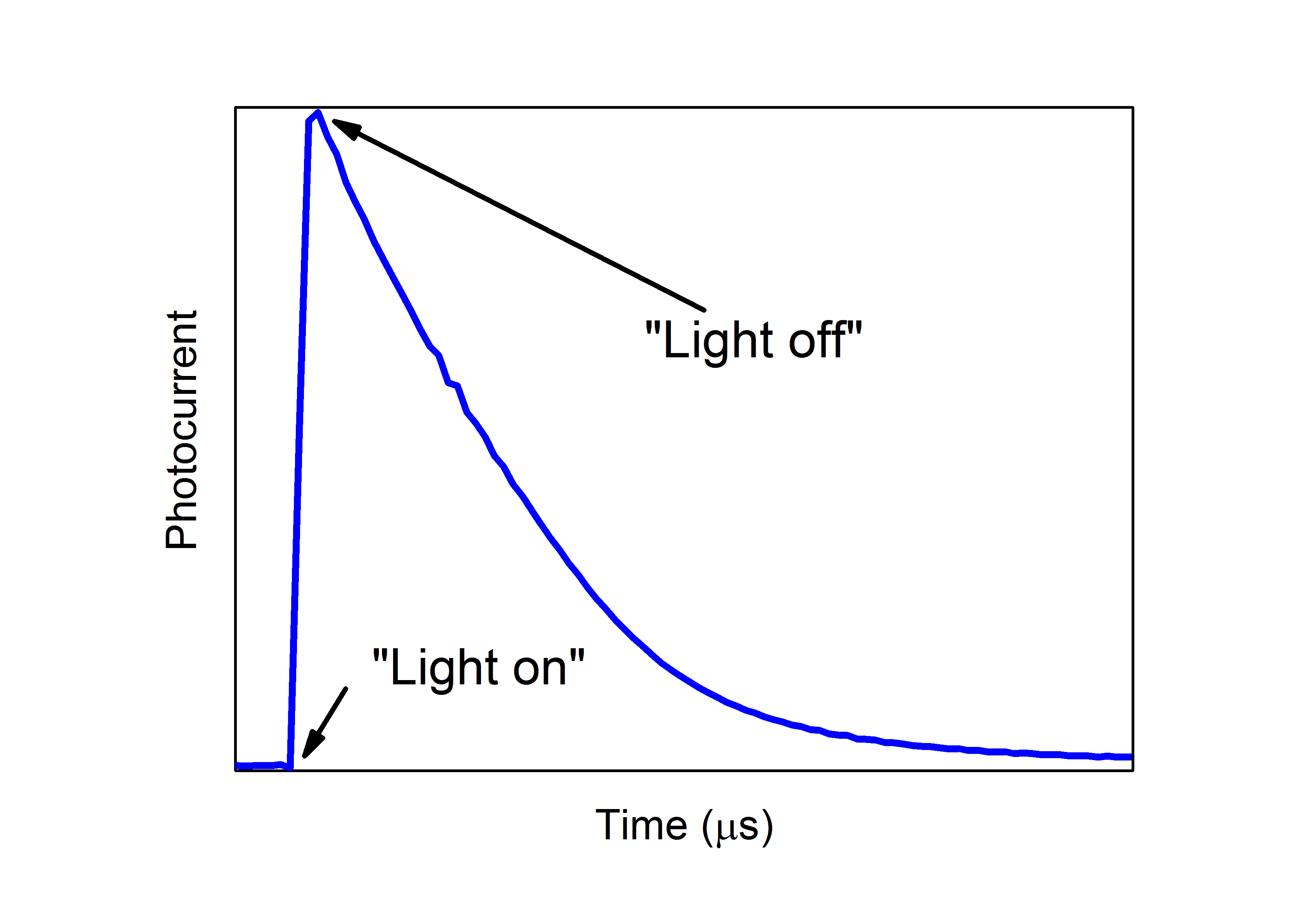
TPC plot in light off position

A semiconductor is sandwiched between two extracting electrodes. When it is excited with a short pulse of light (as short as 100 femtoseconds), the photogenerated charges are extracted on the electrodes, resulting in a current, which is detected by an oscilloscope in form of voltage across a resistor. Since the excitation pulse is square, there are two ways to measure TPC: in a “light on” and a “light off” positions. In a “Light on”, the signal is recorded as soon as the excitation pulse is switched on, allowing to observe the build-up of charges on the electrode after the start of excitation. “Light off” measurements show how the charges decay after the pulse is switched off.

In contrast to transient photovoltage, TPC measurements are conducted under short circuit condition and yield information about extractable charges, charge recombination and density of states. Quite often, TPC measurements help to build “drift-diffusion” model which reflects trapping and detrapping of the photogenerated charges and the quality of contact between different layers.

TPC allows varying different measurement parameters, such as intensity or length of the light pulse, applied voltage, etc.

== See also ==
- Time resolved microwave conductivity
- Photoconductance decay
