= Photocurrent =

Electric current through a photosensitive device

Photocurrent is the electric current through a photosensitive device, such as a photodiode, as the result of exposure to radiant power. The photocurrent may occur as a result of the photoelectric, photoemissive, or photovoltaic effect. The photocurrent may be enhanced by internal gain caused by interaction among ions and photons under the influence of applied fields, such as occurs in an avalanche photodiode (APD).

When a suitable radiation is used, the photoelectric current is directly proportional to intensity of radiation and increases with the increase in accelerating potential till the stage is reached when photo-current becomes maximum and does not increase with further increase in accelerating potential. The highest (maximum) value of the photo-current is called saturation current. The value of retarding potential at which photo-current becomes zero is called cut-off voltage or stopping potential for the given frequency of the incident ray.

== Photovoltaics ==
The generation of a photocurrent forms the basis of the photovoltaic cell.

== Photocurrent spectroscopy ==
A characterization technique called photocurrent spectroscopy (PCS), also known as photoconductivity spectroscopy, is widely used for studying optoelectronic properties of semiconductors and other light absorbing materials. The setup of the technique involves having a semiconductor contacted with electrodes allowing for application of an electric bias, while at the same time a tunable light source incident with a given specific wavelength (energy) and power, usually pulsed by a mechanical chopper.

The quantity measured is the electrical response of the circuit, coupled with the spectrograph obtained by varying the incident light energy by a monochromator. The circuit and optics are coupled by use of a lock-in amplifier. The measurements give information related to the band gap of the semiconductor, allowing for identification of various charge transitions like exciton and trion energies. This is highly relevant for studying semiconductor nanostructures like quantum wells, and other nanomaterials like transition metal dichalcogenide monolayers.

Furthermore, by using a piezo stage to vary the lateral position of the semiconductor with micron precision, one can generate a micrograph false color image of the spectra for different positions. This is called scanning photocurrent microscopy (SPCM).

== See also ==
- Photoconductivity
- Transient photocurrent (TPC)
