= Magnesium tungstate =

Names
- Other names Magnesium tungsten oxide

Identifiers
CAS Number	13573-11-0
ECHA InfoCard	100.033.621
EC Number	236-999-7
PubChem CID	5222468
CompTox Dashboard (EPA)	DTXSID801014397

Properties
Chemical formula	MgWO_{4}
Molar mass	272.14 g/mol
Appearance	White solid
Melting point	1,358 °C (2,476 °F; 1,631 K)
Solubility in water	Practically insoluble in water

Structure
Crystal structure	Monoclinic, wolframite type
Space group	P2/c, No. 13
- Except where otherwise noted, data are given for materials in their standard state (at 25 °C [77 °F], 100 kPa). Infobox references

Magnesium tungstate is an inorganic compound with the chemical formula MgWO_{4}. It is a white, water-insoluble solid that crystallizes in the wolframite structure. It occurs naturally as the rare mineral huanzalaite.

== Structure and properties ==
Magnesium tungstate crystallizes in the monoclinic crystal system with the wolframite-type structure, in space group P2/c (No. 13). The structure consists of distorted MgO_{6} and WO_{6} octahedra arranged in chains.

A high-temperature polymorph is reported above about 1065 °C.

Hydrated forms are also known. The dihydrate, MgWO_{4}·2H_{2}O, crystallizes in space group P2_{1}/c and dehydrates topotactically on heating first to give the monohydrate MgWO_{4}·H_{2}O, and then to the metastable high temperature form of anhydrous MgWO_{4}. Over 650°C the metastable form changes to the low temperature crystal structure.

A monohydrate, MgWO_{4}·H_{2}O, has also been prepared and structurally characterized. A pentahydrate s also known.

At high pressure, MgWO_{4} undergoes structural changes similar to those observed in related wolframite-type tungstates.

== Occurrence ==
Magnesium tungstate occurs naturally as huanzalaite, MgWO_{4}, a rare member of the wolframite group.

== Preparation ==
Magnesium tungstate can be prepared by solid-state reaction of magnesium oxide with tungsten trioxide:

MgO + WO_{3} → MgWO_{4}

It can also be precipitated from aqueous solutions of a magnesium salt (e.g. magnesium nitrate) and sodium tungstate:

Mg(NO_{3})_{2} + Na_{2}WO_{4} → MgWO_{4}↓ + 2 NaNO_{3}

Precipitations from magnesium chloride at 90°C yield the dihydrate as well as at least two solid forms (cubic, trigonal) of magnesium heteropolytungstate.

MgCl_{2} + Na_{2}WO_{4} → MgWO_{4}•2H_{2}O↓ + 2 NaCl + ...

== Applications ==
Magnesium tungstate is a luminescent material and has been used and investigated as a phosphor. Its emission is associated primarily with electronic transitions involving the tungstate groups.

MgWO_{4} has also been investigated as a scintillating material and as a host lattice for luminescent dopants.
