= Drive-level capacitance profiling =

Technique for characterizing semiconductor materials

Drive-level capacitance profiling (DLCP) is a type of capacitance–voltage-profiling characterization technique developed specifically for amorphous and polycrystalline materials, which have more anomalies such as deep levels, interface states, or non-uniformities.

Whereas in standard C–V profiles the charge response is assumed to be linear (dQ = CdV), in DLCP profiles the charge response is expected to have significant non-linear behavior (dQ = C_{0}dV + C_{1}(dV)^{2} + C_{2}(dV)^{3}) due to the significant larger AC-signal amplitude used in the DLCP technique.

DLCP can yield, like admittance spectroscopy, both the spatial and the energetic distribution of defects. The energetic distribution is obtained by varying the frequency of the AC signal, whereas the spatial distribution is sustained by modifications in the applied DC-bias.

DLCP is a strictly dynamic measurement, meaning that the steady-state behavior recorded in a C–V profile is discarded. As a result, DLCP is insensitive to interface states.
