= Deep-level trap =

Deep-level traps or deep-level defects are a generally undesirable type of electronic defect in semiconductors. They are "deep" in the sense that the energy required to remove an electron or hole from the trap to the valence or conduction band is much larger than the characteristic thermal energy kT, where k is the Boltzmann constant and T is the temperature. Deep traps interfere with more useful types of doping by compensating the dominant charge carrier type, annihilating either free electrons or electron holes depending on which is more prevalent. They also directly interfere with the operation of transistors, light-emitting diodes and other electronic and opto-electronic devices, by offering an intermediate state inside the band gap. Deep-level traps shorten the non-radiative life time of charge carriers, and—through the Shockley–Read–Hall (SRH) process—facilitate recombination of minority carriers, having adverse effects on the semiconductor device performance. Hence, deep-level traps are not appreciated in many opto-electronic devices as it may lead to poor efficiency and reasonably large delay in response.

Common chemical elements that produce deep-level defects in silicon include iron, nickel, copper, gold, and silver. In general, transition metals produce this effect, while light metals such as aluminium do not.

Surface states and crystallographic defects in the crystal lattice can also play role of deep-level traps.
