= Lanthanum phosphate =

Names
- Other names Lanthanum orthophosphate

Identifiers
CAS Number	anhydrous: 13778-59-1; hydrate: 14913-14-5
3D model (JSmol)	anhydrous: Interactive image; hydrate: Interactive image
ChemSpider	anhydrous: 140413; hydrate: 17344921
ECHA InfoCard	100.034.003
EC Number	anhydrous: 237-419-5
PubChem CID	anhydrous: 159694; hydrate: 16217373
CompTox Dashboard (EPA)	DTXSID1065631
- InChI: anhydrous: InChI=1S/La.H3O4P/c;1-5(2,3)4/h;(H3,1,2,3,4)/q+3;/p-3 Key: LQFNMFDUAPEJRY-UHFFFAOYSA-K; hydrate: InChI=1S/La.H3O4P.H2O/c;1-5(2,3)4;/h;(H3,1,2,3,4);1H2/q+3;;/p-3 Key: MXLPYXTVXABWIU-UHFFFAOYSA-K
- SMILES: anhydrous: [O-]P(=O)([O-])[O-].[La+3]; hydrate: O.[O-]P(=O)([O-])[O-].[La+3]

Properties
Chemical formula	LaPO_{4}
Molar mass	233.88 g/mol
Appearance	White solid
Solubility in water	Very slightly soluble in water

Structure
Crystal structure	Monoclinic, monazite type (anhydrous)
Space group	P2_{1}/n, No. 14
- Except where otherwise noted, data are given for materials in their standard state (at 25 °C [77 °F], 100 kPa). Infobox references

Lanthanum phosphate is an inorganic compound of lanthanum and phosphate with the chemical formula LaPO_{4}. It occurs in an anhydrous monazite-type form and in hydrated rhabdophane-type forms.

== Structure and properties ==
Anhydrous lanthanum phosphate adopts the monazite structure. It crystallizes in the monoclinic crystal system in space group P2_{1}/n (No. 14). In this structure La^{3+} is nine-coordinate, while phosphorus occurs in isolated PO_{4} tetrahedra.

Hydrated lanthanum phosphate forms the rhabdophane structure, with an approximate composition LaPO_{4}·nH_{2}O. Synthetic rhabdophane commonly contains roughly 0.5–1 molecule of water per formula unit.

On heating, hydrated LaPO_{4} first loses water while retaining the rhabdophane framework. At higher temperatures it irreversibly transforms into the monoclinic monazite phase. The rhabdophane-to-monazite transformation generally occurs between about 500 and 900 °C, depending on preparation conditions. Rhabdophane-type LaPO_{4} has been reported to remain structurally stable to approximately 650 °C before conversion to monazite.

Lanthanum phosphate is chemically durable and only very slightly soluble in water. Monazite-type LaPO_{4} also shows high thermal and radiation stability.

== Preparation ==
Lanthanum phosphate can be prepared by precipitation from aqueous solutions containing La^{3+} and phosphate ions:

La^{3+} + PO_{4}^{3−} → LaPO_{4}↓

Hydrated lanthanum phosphate can, for example, be obtained by reaction of soluble lanthanum salts with sodium phosphate. Hydrothermal synthesis has been used to prepare rhabdophane-type LaPO_{4} nanofibres.

Depending on the synthesis conditions, precipitation can give either hydrated rhabdophane-type LaPO_{4}·nH_{2}O or anhydrous monazite-type LaPO_{4}.

== Applications ==
Lanthanum phosphate has been investigated as a component of high-temperature ceramic composites. Monazite-type LaPO_{4} forms weak interfaces with materials such as alumina and has therefore been studied as a coating and interphase material in ceramic matrix composites.

Hydrated rare-earth phosphates, including LaPO_{4}·nH_{2}O, have also been investigated as proton conductors for intermediate-temperature electrochemical applications.

Monazite-type rare-earth phosphates are also studied as durable host materials for immobilization of radioactive elements because of their chemical stability, radiation resistance and ability to accommodate a wide range of cations in the crystal structure.
