= Charge carrier density =

Charge carriers per volume; such as electrons, ions, "holes" or others

Charge carrier density, also known as carrier concentration, denotes the number of charge carriers per volume. In SI units, it is measured in m^{−3}. As with any density, in principle it can depend on position. However, usually carrier concentration is given as a single number, and represents the average carrier density over the whole material.

Charge carrier densities involve equations concerning the electrical conductivity, related phenomena like the thermal conductivity, and chemicals bonds like covalent bond.

== Calculation ==
The carrier density is usually obtained theoretically by integrating the density of states over the energy range of charge carriers in the material (e.g. integrating over the conduction band for electrons, integrating over the valence band for holes).

If the total number of charge carriers is known, the carrier density can be found by simply dividing by the volume. To show this mathematically, charge carrier density is a particle density, so integrating it over a volume $V$ gives the number of charge carriers $N$ in that volume
$$N=\int_V n(\mathbf r) \,dV.$$
where $n(\mathbf r)$ is the position-dependent charge carrier density.

If the density does not depend on position and is instead equal to a constant $n_0$ this equation simplifies to
$$N = V \cdot n_0.$$

== Semiconductors ==
The carrier density is important for semiconductors, where it is an important quantity for the process of chemical doping. Using band theory, the electron density $n_0$ is the number of electrons per volume unit in the conduction band. For holes, $p_0$ is the number of holes per unit volume in the valence band. To calculate this number for electrons, it is considered that the total density of conduction-band electrons, $n_0$, is determined by the sum of conduction electron densities across the different energies in the band, from the bottom of the band $E_c$ to the top of the band $E_\text{top}$.

$$n_0 = \int_{E_c}^{E_\text{top}}N(E) \, dE$$

Because electrons are fermions, the density of conduction electrons at any particular energy, $N(E)$ is the product of the density of states, $g(E)$ or how many conducting states are possible, with the Fermi–Dirac distribution, $f(E)$ which tells us the portion of those states which will actually have electrons in them
$$N(E) = g(E) f(E)$$

In order to simplify the calculation, instead of treating the electrons as fermions, according to the Fermi–Dirac distribution, we instead treat them as a classical non-interacting gas, which is given by the Maxwell–Boltzmann distribution. This approximation has negligible effects when the magnitude $|E-E_f| \gg k_\text{B} T$, which is true for semiconductors near room temperature. This approximation is invalid at very low temperatures or an extremely small band-gap.

$$f(E)=\frac{1}{1+e^{\frac{E-E_f}{k_\text{B} T}}} \approx e^{-\frac{E-E_f}{k_\text{B} T}}$$

The three-dimensional density of states is:
$$g(E) = \frac {1}{2\pi^2} \left(\frac{2m^*}{\hbar^2}\right)^\frac{3}{2}\sqrt{E - E_0}$$

After combination and simplification, these expressions lead to:

$$n_0 = 2 \left(\frac{ m^* k_\text{B} T}{2 \pi \hbar^2}\right)^{3/2} e^{-\frac{E_c - E_f}{k_\text{B} T}}$$

Here $m^*$ is the effective mass of the electrons in that particular semiconductor, and the quantity $E_c-E_f$ is the difference in energy between the conduction band and the Fermi level, which is half the band gap, $E_g$:

$$E_g=2(E_c-E_f)$$

A similar expression can be derived for holes. The carrier concentration can be calculated by treating electrons moving back and forth across the bandgap just like the equilibrium of a reversible reaction from chemistry, leading to an electronic mass action law. The mass action law defines a quantity $n_i$ called the intrinsic carrier concentration, which for undoped materials:

$$n_i=n_0=p_0$$

The following table lists a few values of the intrinsic carrier concentration for intrinsic semiconductors, in order of increasing band gap.

Material	Carrier density (1/cm^{3}) at 300K
Germanium	2.33×10^{13}
Silicon	9.65×10^{9}
Gallium Arsenide	2.1×10^{6}
3C-SiC	1.0×10^{1}
6H-SiC	2.3×10^{−6}
4H-SiC	8.2×10^{−9}
Gallium nitride	1.9×10^{−10}
Diamond	1.6×10^{−27}

These carrier concentrations will change if these materials are doped. For example, doping pure silicon with a small amount of phosphorus will increase the carrier density of electrons, n. Then, since n > p, the doped silicon will be a n-type extrinsic semiconductor. Doping pure silicon with a small amount of boron will increase the carrier density of holes, so then p > n, and it will be a p-type extrinsic semiconductor.

== Metals ==
The carrier density is also applicable to metals, where it can be estimated from the simple Drude model. In this case, the carrier density (in this context, also called the free electron density) can be estimated by:

$$n=\frac{N_\text{A} Z \rho_m}{m_a}$$

Where $N_\text{A}$ is the Avogadro constant, Z is the number of valence electrons, $\rho_m$ is the density of the material, and $m_a$ is the atomic mass. Since metals can display multiple oxidation numbers, the exact definition of how many "valence electrons" an element should have in elemental form is somewhat arbitrary, but the following table lists the free electron densities given in Ashcroft and Mermin, which were calculated using the formula above based on reasonable assumptions about valence, $Z$, and with mass densities, $\rho_m$ calculated from experimental crystallography data.

Material	Number of valence electrons	Carrier density (1/cm^{3}) at 300K
Copper	1	8.47×10^{22}
Silver	1	5.86×10^{22}
Gold	1	5.90×10^{22}
Beryllium	2	2.47×10^{23}
Magnesium	2	8.61×10^{22}
Calcium	2	4.61×10^{22}
Strontium	2	3.55×10^{22}
Barium	2	3.15×10^{22}
Niobium	1	5.56×10^{22}
Iron	2	1.70×10^{23}
Manganese	2	1.65×10^{23}
Zinc	2	1.32×10^{23}
Cadmium	2	9.27×10^{22}
Aluminum	3	1.81×10^{23}
Gallium	3	1.54×10^{23}
Indium	3	1.15×10^{23}
Thallium	3	1.05×10^{23}
Tin	4	1.48×10^{23}
Lead	4	1.32×10^{23}
Bismuth	5	1.41×10^{17}
Antimony	5	1.65×10^{23}

The values for n among metals inferred for example by the Hall effect are often on the same orders of magnitude, but this simple model cannot predict carrier density to very high accuracy.

== Measurement ==
The density of charge carriers can be determined in many cases using the Hall effect, the voltage of which depends inversely on the carrier density.
