= 3D cell culturing by magnetic levitation =

Application of growing 3D tissue

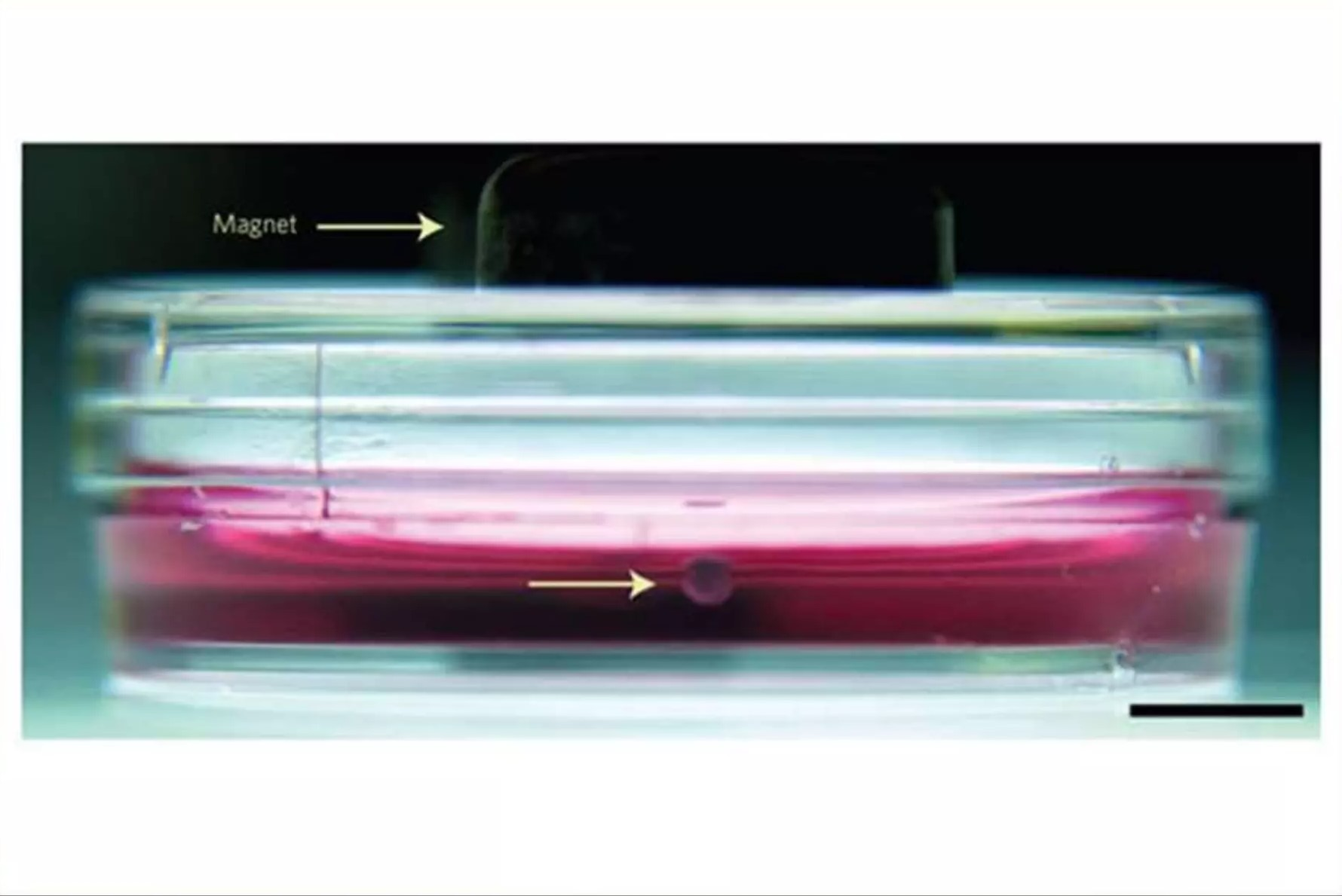
3D cell culture grown with MLM. Human Glioblastoma (HGBM) cells (indicated by the lower arrow) treated with magnetic nanoparticles were held at the air-medium interface by the magnetic field created by the magnet attached to the top of the first tissue culture plate. This image was taken after 48 hours of culturing.

The Magnetic Levitation Method (MLM) is a technique for growing 3D cell cultures. In this approach, cells are treated with magnetic nanoparticles and exposed to spatially varying magnetic fields produced by neodymium magnetic drivers. The process causes cells to levitate to the air-liquid interface within a standard petri dish. The magnetic nanoparticle assemblies consist of magnetic iron oxide nanoparticles, gold nanoparticles, and cell-adhesive peptide sequences.

This method can be applied to cultures with five hundred to millions of cells and is adaptable for use in single-dish systems as well as high-throughput, low-volume systems. Magnetized cells can also be used as building blocks for magnetic 3D bioprinting.

== Overview ==
3D cell culture methods have been developed to enable research into the behavior of cells in an environment that represents their interactions in-vivo more accurately.

3D cell culturing by magnetic levitation uses biocompatible polymer-based reagents to deliver magnetic nanoparticles to individual cells, so that an applied magnetic driver can levitate cells off the bottom of the cell culture dish, rapidly bringing cells together near the air-liquid interface. This act initiates cell-cell interactions in the absence of any artificial surface or matrix. Magnetic fields are designed to form 3D multicellular structures, including the expression of extracellular matrix proteins. The matrix, protein expression, and response to exogenous agents of the resulting tissue show similarity to in-vivo results.

== History ==
3D cell culturing by magnetic levitation method (MLM) was developed with collaboration between scientists at Rice University and University of Texas MD Anderson Cancer Center in 2008. 3D cell culturing technology was later licensed and commercialized by Nano3D Biosciences.

== Mechanism ==
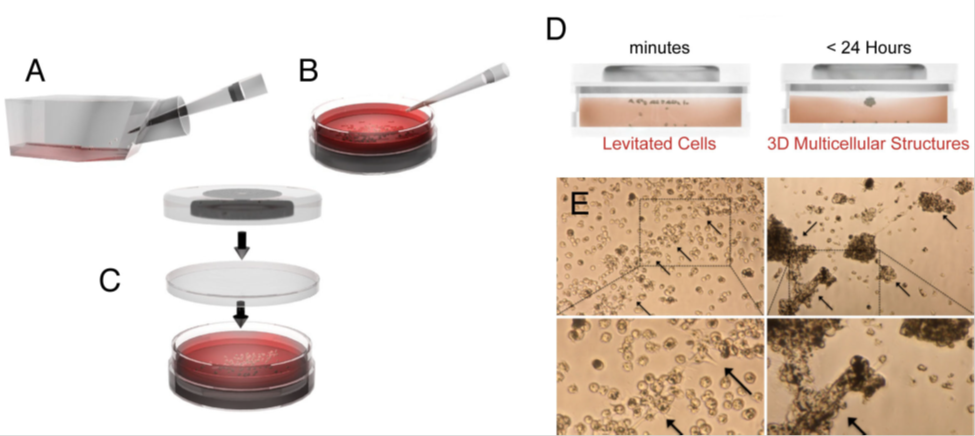
Process demonstrating 3D cell culturing through magnetic levitation with a cell culturing system, split into five phases (A to E).(A) A magnetic iron oxide nanoparticle assembly, known as the "nanoshuttle", is added and dispersed over cells, and the mixture is incubated. (B) After incubation with the nanoshuttle, the cells are detached and transferred to a petri dish. (C) A magnetic drive is then placed on top of a petri dish. (D) The magnetic field causes cells to rise to the air–medium interface. (E) Human umbilical vein endothelial cells (HUVEC) levitated for 60 minutes (left two images in E) and 4 hours (right two images in E) (scale bar: 50 μm).

The mechanism of the magnetic levitation model in 3D cell culturing combines various techniques within the frame of nanobiotechnology. One approach to the process is described below.

At the beginning of the process, magnetite nanoparticles are added, then dispersed uniformly throughout the cell culture. After the cell culture containing the nanoparticles has been allowed to incubate, it is moved to a petri dish, and a magnetic drive is placed on top of the petri dish. When an external magnetic field is applied through the drive, it causes the cell culture mixture, still containing the magnetic nanoparticles, to levitate within the petri dish.

The levitation results in immediate cell-cell interaction. After the mixture disperses and stretches, there is gradual formation of 3D structures that are visible after about 4 hours. The magnetic iron oxide nanoparticles are described as the "nanoshuttle", in which their magnetic properties allows the cells to rise within the culture they are added to due to the external magnetic field, thus "shuttling".

== Protein expression ==
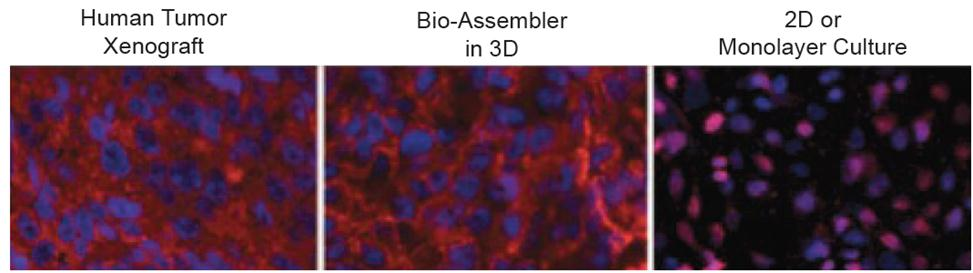
Distribution of N-cadherin (red) and nuclei (blue). Left: human brain cancer cells grown in a mouse brain (xenograft). Middle: brain cancer cells cultured by 3D magnetic levitation for 48 hours. Right: cells cultured on a 2D glass slide cover slip.

Patterns of protein expression in levitated cultures resemble the patterns observed in-vivo. For example, as shown in the figure on the right, N-cadherin expression in levitated human glioblastoma (GBM) cells was similar to that seen in human tumor xenografts grown in immunodeficient mice (comparing the left and middle images), while standard 2D culture showed much weaker expression that did not match xenograft distribution (comparing the left and right images). The transmembrane protein N-cadherin is often used as an indicator of in-vivo-like tissue assembly in 3D culturing.

Referring to the figure, in the mouse and levitated culture (left and middle image), N-cadherin is clearly concentrated in the membrane, and also present in cytoplasm and cell junctions, whereas the 2D system (right image) shows N-cadherin in the cytoplasm and nucleus, but absent from the membrane.

== Applications ==
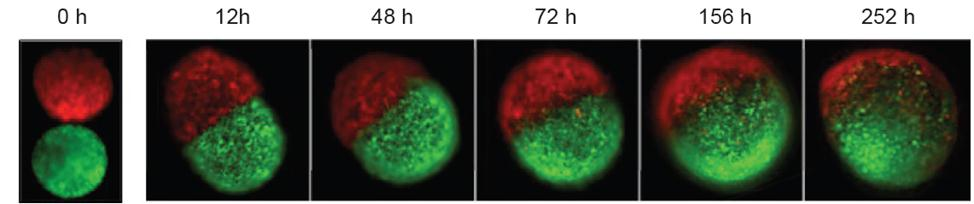
An invasion assay of magnetically levitated multicellular spheroids. Fluorescence images of human GBM cells (green; GFP-expressing cells) and NHA (red; MCherry-labelled), cultured separately then magnetically guided together.

=== Co-culturing, magnetic manipulation, and invasion assays ===
One of the challenges of in vitro modelling of complex tissues is the difficulty of co-culturing different cell types. Co-culturing of different cell types can be achieved at the onset of levitation, either by mixing different cell types before levitation, or by magnetically guiding 3D cultures in an invasion assay format.

Co-culturing in a realistic tissue architecture is important for accurately modeling in-vivo conditions. One example is increasing the accuracy of cellular assays, as shown in the figure on the right. In the figure, the human GBM cells and normal human astrocytes (NHA) are cultured separately and then magnetically guided together (left, time 0). Invasion of GBM into NHA in 3D culture provides an assay for basic cancer biology and drug screening (right, 12h to 252h).

Magnetic levitation has shown potential for maintaining cell viability and simulating in vivo conditions. However, its scalability and efficacy in comparison to traditional culturing methods have been topics of discussion.

=== Vascular simulation with stem cells ===
By facilitating the assembly of different populations of cells using the MLM, consistent generation of organoids, termed adipospheres, capable of simulating the complex intercellular interactions of endogenous white adipose tissue (WAT) can be achieved.

Co-culturing 3T3-L1 preadipocytes in a 3D space with murine endothelial bEND.3 cells can create a vascular-like network assembly with concomitant lipogenesis in perivascular cells (refer to the attached figure).

In addition to cell lines, organogenesis of white adipose tissue (WAT) can be simulated from primary cells.

Adipocyte-depleted stromal vascular fraction (SVF) containing adipose stromal cells (ASC), endothelial cells, and infiltrating leukocytes derived from mouse WAT were cultured in 3D. This revealed organoids striking in hierarchical organization with distinct capsules and internal large vessel-like structures lined with endothelial cells, as well as perivascular localization of ASC.

Upon adipogenesis induction of either 3T3-L1 adipospheres or adipospheres derived from SVF, the cells efficiently formed large lipid droplets typical of white adipocytes in-vivo, whereas only smaller lipid droplet formation is achievable in 2D. This indicates intercellular signalling that better recapitulates WAT organogenesis.

This MLM for 3D co-culturing creates a liposphere appropriate for WAT modeling ex vivo and provides a new platform for functional screens to identify molecules bioactive toward individual adipose cell populations. It can also be adopted for WAT transplantation applications and aid other approaches to WAT-based cell therapy.

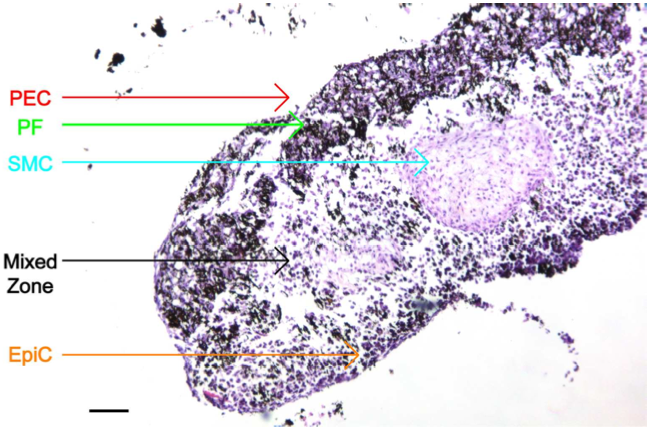
Organized bronchiole created with a 3D cell culturing system and cell manipulation tool. Scale bar: 100um.

=== Organized co-culturing to create in-vivo-like tissue ===
The use of additional manipulation tools may be needed to organize 3D co-cultures into a configuration similar enough to native tissue architecture.

Endothelial cells (PEC), smooth muscle cells (SMC), fibroblasts (PF), and epithelial cells (EpiC) cultured through magnetic levitation can be sequentially layered in a drag-and-drop manner to create bronchioles that maintain phenotype and induce extracellular matrix formation.

== Cell types cultured ==
Below is a list of cell types (primary and cell lines) that have been successfully cultured by the magnetic levitation method.

Cells	Cell line	Organism	Organ tissue	Image
Murine endothelial	Cell line	Mouse	Vessel	
Murine adipocyte	Cell line	Mouse	Adipose	Adipocytes cultured by MLM acquire in-vivo morphology in adipospheres.
Rattus norvegicus hepatoma	Cell line	Rat	Liver	Hepatoma cultured by MLM for different cell numbers at 24 hours.
Human pulmonary fibroblasts (HPF)	Primary	Human	Lung	Primary pulmonary fibroblasts cultured by MLM compared to in-vivo.
Pulmonary endothelial (HPMEC)	Primary	Human	Lung	
Small airway epithelial (HSAEpiC)	Primary	Human	Lung	Primary small airway epithelial cells cultured by MLM compared to in-vivo.
Bronchial epithelial	Primary	Human	Lung	
Human alveolar adenocarcinoma	A549	Human	Lung	Human alveolar adenocarcinoma cell line - A549 cultured by MLM at different time points and cell numbers. Immunohistochemistry (IHC) reveals epithelial markers on A549 after culturing in 3D with the MLM.
Type II alveolar	Primary	Human	Lung	
Human tracheal smooth muscle cells (HTSMCs)	Primary	Human	Lung	HTSMCs cultured by MLM with IHC staining.
Human mesenchymal stem cells (HMSCs)	Primary	Human	Bone marrow	HMSCs cultured by MLM.
Human bone marrow endothelial cells (HBMECs)	Primary	Human	Bone marrow	
Dental pulp stem cells (DPSCs)	Primary	Human		Dental pulp cultured by MLM (3D vs. 2D) - 5 days.
Human umbilical vein endothelial cells (HUVECs)	Primary	Human		HUVECs cultured by MLM in 24 Well format.
Murine chondrocytes	Primary	Mouse	Bone	Chondrocytes cultured in 3D by MLM at different time points.
Murine adipose tissue	Primary	Mouse		Primary WAT cells cultured by MLM assemble into vascularized adipospheres.
Heart valve endothelial	Primary	Porcine		
Pre-adipocytes fibroblasts	3T3	Mouse		
Neural stem cells	C17.2	Mouse	Brain	Levitating neural stem cells cultured by MLM.
Human embryonic kidney cells	HEK293	Human	Kidney	HEK 293 cultured by MLM and tested with ibuprofen using bioassay.
Melanoma	B16	Mouse	Skin	
Astrocytes	NHA	Human	Brain	Astrocyte and glioblastoma invasion assay performed after 3D culturing by MLM.
Glioblastomas	LN229	Human	Brain	Glioblastoma cultured with Bio-Assembler vs. Matrigel at 24 hours.
T-cells and antigen presenting cells		Human		
Mammary epithelial	MCF10A	Human	Breast	Bio-Assembler vs. Matrigel with human mammary epithelial cells.
Breast cancer	MDA231	Human	Breast	
Osteosarcoma	MG63	Human	Bone	
