= Epithelial polarity =

Type of biological cell polarity

Epithelial polarity is one example of the cell polarity that is a fundamental feature of many types of cells. Epithelial cells feature distinct 'apical', 'lateral' and 'basal' plasma membrane domains. Epithelial cells connect to one another via their lateral membranes to form epithelial sheets that line cavities and surfaces throughout the animal body. Each plasma membrane domain has a distinct protein composition, giving them distinct properties and allowing directional transport of molecules across the epithelial sheet. How epithelial cells generate and maintain polarity remains unclear, but certain molecules have been found to play a key role.

A variety of molecules are located at the apical membrane, but only a few key molecules act as determinants that are required to maintain the identity of the apical membrane and, thus, epithelial polarity. These molecules are the proteins Cdc42, atypical protein kinase C (aPKC), Par6, Par3/Bazooka/ASIP. Crumbs, "Stardust" and protein at tight junctions (PATJ). These molecules appear to form two distinct complexes: an aPKC-Par3-Par6 "aPKC" (or "Par") complex that also interacts with Cdc42; and a Crumbs-Stardust-PATJ "Crumbs" complex. Of these two complexes, the aPKC complex is the most important for epithelial polarity, being required even when the Crumbs complex is not. Crumbs is the only transmembrane protein in this list and the Crumbs complex serves as an apical cue to keep the aPKC complex apical during complex cellular shape changes.

== Basolateral membranes ==
In the context of renal tubule physiology, the term basolateral membrane refers to the cell membrane which is oriented away from the lumen of the tubule, whereas the term apical or luminal membrane refers to the cell membrane which is oriented towards the lumen. The principal function of this basolateral membrane is to take up metabolic waste products into the epithelial cell for disposal into the lumen where it is transported out of the body as urine. A secondary role of the basolateral membrane is to allow the recycling of desirable substrates, such as glucose, that have been rescued from the lumen of the tubule to be secreted into the interstitial fluids.

Basal and lateral membranes share common determinants, the proteins LLGL1, DLG1, and SCRIB. These three proteins all localize to the basolateral domain and are essential for basolateral identity and for epithelial polarity.

== Mechanisms of polarity ==
How epithelial cells polarize is still not fully understood. Some key principles have been proposed to maintain polarity, but the mechanisms behind these principles remain to be discovered.

The first principle is positive feedback. In computer models, a molecule that can be either membrane-associated or cytoplasmic can polarize when its association with the membrane is subject to positive feedback: that membrane localization occurs most strongly where the molecule is already most highly concentrated. In similar models, researchers have shown that epithelial cells can self-assemble into a rich set of robust biological shapes. In the yeast saccharomyces cerevisiae, there is genetic evidence that Cdc42 is subject to positive feedback of this kind and can spontaneously polarize, even in the absence of an external cue. In the fruit fly Drosophila melanogaster, Cdc42 is recruited by the aPKC complex and then promotes the apical localization of the aPKC complex in a probable positive feedback loop. Thus, in the absence of Cdc42 or the aPKC complex, apical determinants cannot be maintained at the apical membrane and consequently, apical identity and polarity is lost.

The second principle is segregation of polarity determinants. The sharp distinction between apical and baso-lateral domains is maintained by an active mechanism that prevents mixing. The nature of this mechanism is not known, but it clearly depends on the polarity determinants. In the absence of the aPKC complex, the baso-lateral determinants spread into the former apical domain. Conversely, in the absence of any of Lgl, Dlg or Scrib, the apical determinants spread into the former baso-lateral domain. Thus, the two determinants behave as if they exert mutual repulsion upon one another.

The third principle is directed exocytosis. Apical membrane proteins are trafficked from the Golgi to the apical, rather than baso-lateral, membrane because apical determinants serve to identify the correct destination for vesicle delivery. A related mechanism is likely to operate for the baso-lateral membranes.

The fourth principle is lipid modification. A component of the lipid bilayer, phosphatidyl inositol phosphate (PIP) can be phosphorylated to form PIP_{2} and PIP_{3}. In some epithelial cells, PIP_{2} is apically localised while PIP_{3} is basolaterally localised. In at least one cultured cell line, the MDCK cell, this system is required for epithelial polarity. The relationship between this system and the polarity determinants in animal tissues remains unclear.

== Basal versus lateral ==
Since basal and lateral membranes share the same determinants, another mechanism must make the difference between the two domains. Cell shape and contacts provide the likely mechanism. Lateral membranes are the site of contact between epithelial cells, whereas basal membranes connect epithelial cells to the basement membrane, an extracellular matrix layer that lies along the basal surface of the epithelium. Certain molecules, such as Integrins, localise specifically to the basal membrane and form connections with the extracellular matrix.

== Epithelial cell shape ==
Epithelial cells come in a variety of shapes that relate to their function in development or physiology. How epithelial cells adopt particular shapes is poorly understood, but it must involve spatial control of the actin cytoskeleton, which is central to cell shape in all plant cells.

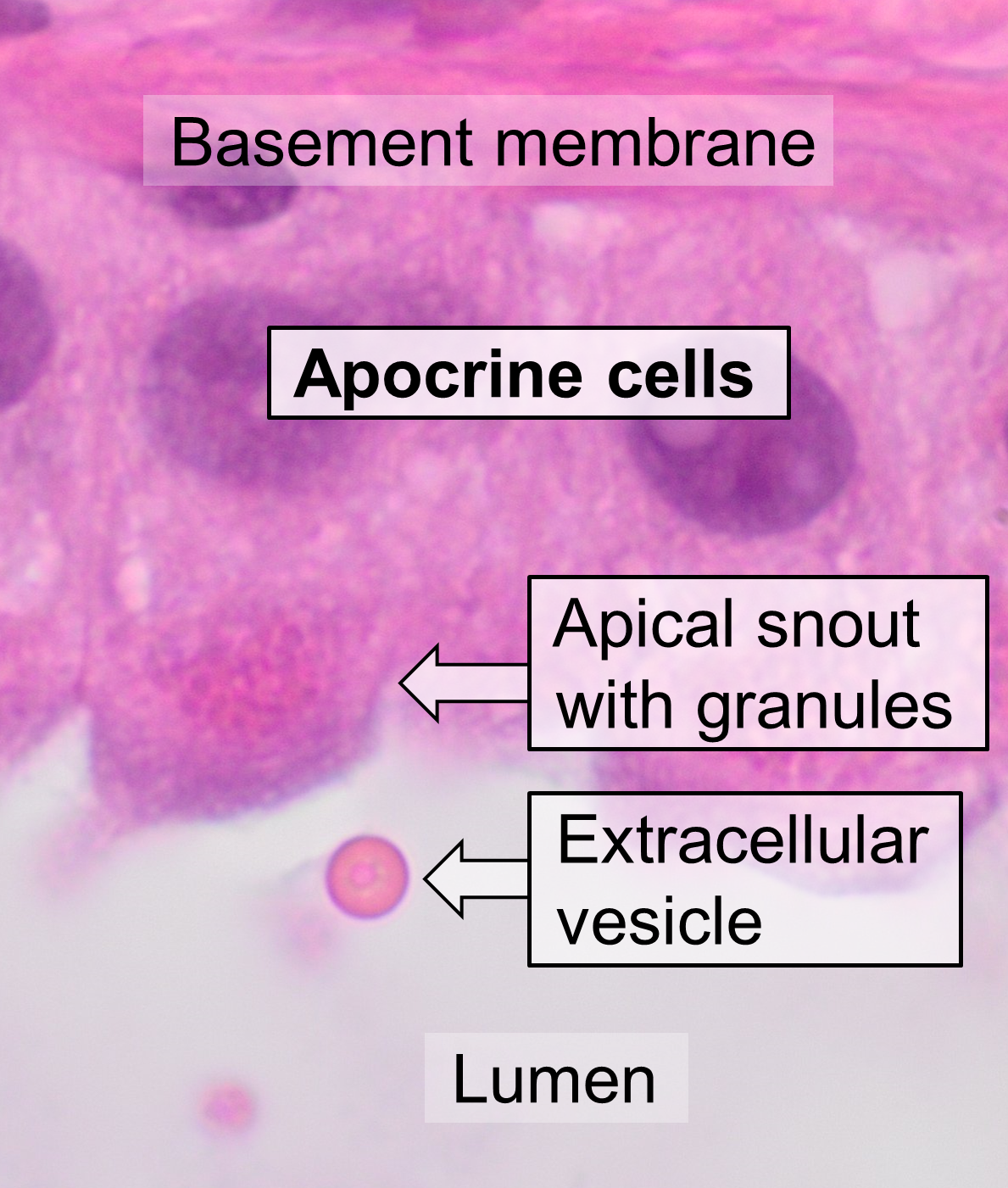
Apocrine cells, showing apical snouts towards the lumen.

Apical snouts, also called apical blebs, are small protrusions of cytoplasm towards the lumen. They are found normally in apocrine cells, and can also appear in apocrine metaplasia and columnar cell changes in the breast.

== Epithelial cadherin ==
All epithelial cells express the transmembrane adhesion molecule E-cadherin, a cadherin which localises most prominently to the junction between the apical and lateral membranes. The extra-cellular domains of E-cadherin molecules from neighbouring cells bind to one another via a homotypic interaction. The intra-cellular domains of E-cadherin molecules bind to the actin cytoskeleton via the adaptor proteins alpha-catenin and beta-catenin. Thus, E-cadherin forms adherens junctions that connect the actin cytoskeletons of neighbouring cells. Adherens junctions are the primary force-bearing junctions between epithelial cells and are fundamentally important for maintaining epithelial cell shape and for dynamic changes in shape during tissue development. How E-cadherin localizes to the boundary between apical and lateral membranes is not known, but polarized membranes are essential for maintaining E-cadherin at adherens junctions.

== See also ==
- Cell polarity
