= SCRIB =

Protein-coding gene in the species Homo sapiens

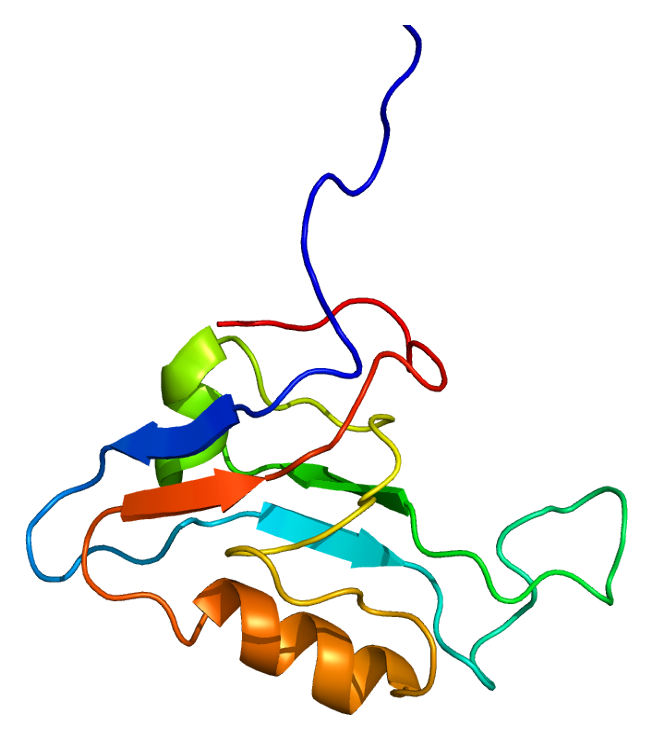

Identifiers
- Aliases: SCRIB, CRIB1, SCRB1, SCRIB1, Vartul, scribbled planar cell polarity protein, scribble planar cell polarity protein, oSCRIB
- External IDs: OMIM: 607733; MGI: 2145950; GeneCards: SCRIB
Available structures
| PDB | Ortholog search: PDBe RCSB |
| PDB | List of PDB id codes 1UJU, 1WHA, 1X5Q, 2W4F, 4WYU, 4WYT |

Gene location (Human)
| Chr. | Chromosome 8 (human) |
| Band | 8q24.3 | Start | 143,790,920 bp |
| Band | 8q24.3 | End | 143,815,773 bp |

Gene location (Mouse)
| Chr. | Chromosome 15 (mouse) |
| Band | 15 D3|15 35.29 cM | Start | 75,919,007 bp |
| Band | 15 D3|15 35.29 cM | End | 75,941,633 bp |
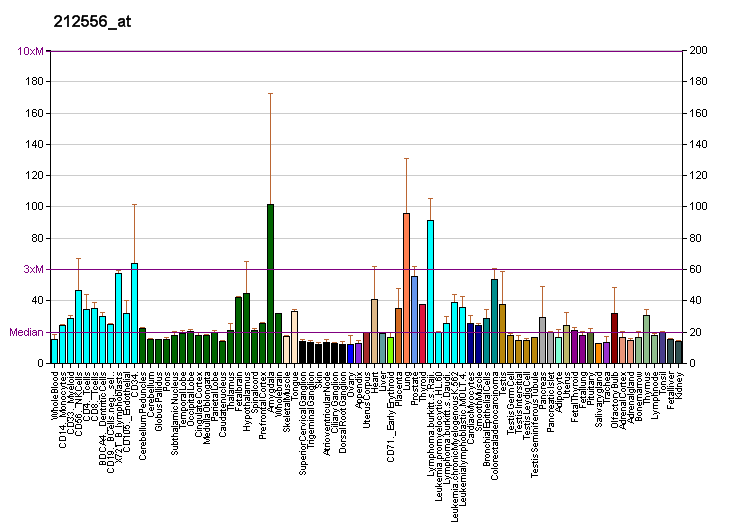
RNA expression pattern
| Bgee | Human / Mouse (ortholog); Top expressed in: right uterine tube; skin of abdomen; mucosa of transverse colon; skin of leg; vagina; amygdala; ventricular zone; tibial nerve; C1 segment; minor salivary glands / Top expressed in: otic vesicle; saccule; otic placode; spermatocyte; seminiferous tubule; lip; ventricular zone; internal carotid artery; spermatid; neural layer of retina; More reference expression data |
| BioGPS | More reference expression data |
Gene ontology
| Molecular function | protein binding; guanylate kinase activity; ionotropic glutamate receptor binding; cadherin binding |
| Cellular component | postsynaptic membrane; cell projection; membrane; cell-cell junction; adherens junction; plasma membrane; nucleoplasm; myelin sheath abaxonal region; cell junction; cell leading edge; presynapse; extracellular exosome; presynaptic membrane; lamellipodium; Scrib-APC-beta-catenin complex; cytoplasm; cell-cell contact zone; ionotropic glutamate receptor complex; postsynaptic density; basolateral plasma membrane; synapse; glutamatergic synapse; extrinsic component of postsynaptic density membrane |
| Biological process | cell differentiation; establishment of apical/basal cell polarity; synaptic vesicle targeting; activation of GTPase activity; astrocyte cell migration; apoptotic process involved in morphogenesis; wound healing; auditory receptor cell morphogenesis; mammary gland duct morphogenesis; auditory receptor cell stereocilium organization; multicellular organism development; neural tube closure; synaptic vesicle endocytosis; protein localization to adherens junction; positive regulation of apoptotic process; positive chemotaxis; morphogenesis of embryonic epithelium; cell population proliferation; viral process; cell migration; cochlear nucleus development; negative regulation of mitotic cell cycle; positive regulation of receptor recycling; chemical synaptic transmission; receptor clustering; establishment or maintenance of epithelial cell apical/basal polarity; GMP metabolic process; GDP metabolic process; receptor localization to synapse; neurotransmitter receptor transport, endosome to postsynaptic membrane; neurotransmitter receptor transport postsynaptic membrane to endosome; suppression by virus of host type I interferon-mediated signaling pathway; suppression by virus of host innate immune response; suppression by virus of host JAK-STAT cascade via inhibition of STAT1 activity; suppression by virus of host JAK-STAT cascade via inhibition of STAT2 activity; cell-cell adhesion; protein localization; vesicle-mediated transport in synapse; regulation of postsynaptic neurotransmitter receptor internalization; post-anal tail morphogenesis; inner ear receptor cell stereocilium organization |
Sources:Amigo / QuickGO
Orthologs
| Databases | NCBI: entry; OMA: entry |
| Species | Human | Mouse |
| Entrez | 23513 | 105782 |
| Ensembl | ENSG00000274287; ENSG00000180900 | ENSMUSG00000022568 |
| UniProt | Q14160 | Q80U72 |
| RefSeq (mRNA) | NM_182706; NM_015356 | NM_134089; NM_001310542; NM_001310543 |
| RefSeq (protein) | NP_056171; NP_874365 | NP_001297471; NP_001297472; NP_598850 |
| Location (UCSC) | Chr 8: 143.79 – 143.82 Mb | Chr 15: 75.92 – 75.94 Mb |
| PubMed search |
- Wikidata
| View/Edit Human | View/Edit Mouse |

SCRIB, also known as Scribble, SCRIBL, or Scribbled homolog (Drosophila), is a scaffold protein which in humans is encoded by the SCRIB gene. It was originally isolated in Drosophila melanogaster in a pathway (also known as the Scribble complex) with DLGAP5 (Discs large) and LLGL1 (Lethal giant larvae) as a tumor suppressor. In humans, SCRIB is found as a membrane protein and is involved in cell migration, cell polarity, and cell proliferation in epithelial cells. There is also strong evidence that SCRIB may play a role in cancer progression because of its strong homology to the Drosophila protein.

== Function ==
In Drosophila melanogaster, SCRIB is involved in synaptic function, neuroblast differentiation, and epithelial polarization. Mechanistically, the human homolog is a scaffold protein linked to cellular differentiation centered on the regulation of epithelial as well as neuronal morphogenesis. Deficiency in SCRIB impairs many aspects of cell polarity and cell movement. SCRIB is also likely involved in establishing apical-basal polarity as well as progression from the G1 phase to S phase in the cell cycle as a result of its relationship with cell proliferation and exocytosis.

The transcribed protein products of the SCRIB gene along with DLGAP5 (Discs large) and LLGL1 (Lethal giant larvae) are components of the Scribble complex that is localized in the basolateral membrane. The Scribble complex plays a role in determining cell polarity and cell proliferation in epithelial cells. The precise mechanism by which these proteins function together is currently unknown, but they have been implicated in several signaling pathways, vesicle trafficking, and in the myosin II-actin cytoskeleton. The Scribble complex has been shown to promote basolateral membrane identity by antagonizing both the Par complex and the Crumbs complex, which promote apical membrane identity. These genes have also been identified as tumor suppressors in Drosophila melanogaster. Since these genes are highly conserved in humans, there is evidence that they play a role in cancer progression.

== Structure ==
The human homolog is a LAP protein, it contains 16 leucine-rich repeats and four PDZ domains. SCRIB belongs to a protein complex containing betaPIX, an exchange factor for Rac/Cdc42, and GIT1, a GTPase activating protein for ARF6 implicated in receptor recycling and exocytosis.

== Subcellular and tissue distribution ==
SCRIB is found in the cell membrane most often as a peripheral membrane protein. The Scribble complex is localized at the basolateral membrane. SCRIB is also found in cellular junctions such as adherens junctions and tight junctions. Specifically, it is located in the kidney, skeletal muscles, liver, lung, breast, intestine, placenta and epithelial cells.

== Clinical significance ==
The PDZ domain of SCRIB binds directly to the human papillomavirus E6 protein. SCRIB is targeted for ubiquitination by a complex of E6 and UBE3A and E6 induces degradation of SCRIB.

=== Role as a tumor suppressor ===
As mentioned above, SCRIB has been identified as a tumor suppressor along with DLGAP5 (Discs large) and LLGL1 (Lethal giant larvae). Specifically, SCRIB deficient mutants have been shown to promote the activity of numerous oncogenes. For example, SCRIB is known to inhibit breast cancer formation and the depletion of SCRIB promotes neoplastic growth by disrupting morphogenesis and inhibiting cell death through an association with Myc. In human cells expressing oncogenic Ras or Raf, it was found the loss of SCRIB resulted in the invasion of the extracellular matrix by various cell types. This is believed to be a direct result of regulation of the MAP Kinase pathway by SCRIB.

=== Role in epithelial mesenchymal transition (EMT) ===
Due to its role in cell polarity and cell motility, SCRIB has also been implicated in epithelial mesenchymal transition (EMT), which is linked to tumor metastasis and proliferation in many cancers. EMT is implicated in cancer progression by allowing static epithelial cells to become migratory and allowing these cells to adapt to as well as colonize new environments. In cancerous epithelial tissues, SCRIB is found primarily in the cytosol as opposed to its usual location in the membrane, thus further implicating a role in tumor progression and EMT for SCRIB.

Knockdown mutants have resulted in the loss of adhesion between Madin-Darby canine kidney epithelial cells. This loss of adhesion was correlated with an acquired mesenchymal appearance, an increase in motility, and loss of directionality. These effects were a direct result of the interruption of E-cadherin-mediated cellular adhesion. A decrease in cell migration and an overall decrease in cell motility markers as well as epithelial mesenchymal transition mediators was also observed in small lung adenocarcinoma cells that were depleted of SCRIB.
