= Cell polarity =

Polar morphology of a cell, a specific orientation of the cell structure

Cell polarity refers to spatial differences in shape, structure, and function within a cell. Almost all cell types exhibit some form of polarity, which enables them to carry out specialized functions. Classical examples of polarized cells are described below, including epithelial cells with apical-basal polarity, neurons in which signals propagate in one direction from dendrites to axons, and migrating cells. Furthermore, cell polarity is important during many types of asymmetric cell division to set up functional asymmetries between daughter cells.

Many of the key molecular players implicated in cell polarity are well conserved. For example, in metazoan cells, the PAR-3/PAR-6/aPKC complex plays a fundamental role in cell polarity. While the biochemical details may vary, some of the core principles such as negative and/or positive feedback between different molecules are common and essential to many known polarity systems.

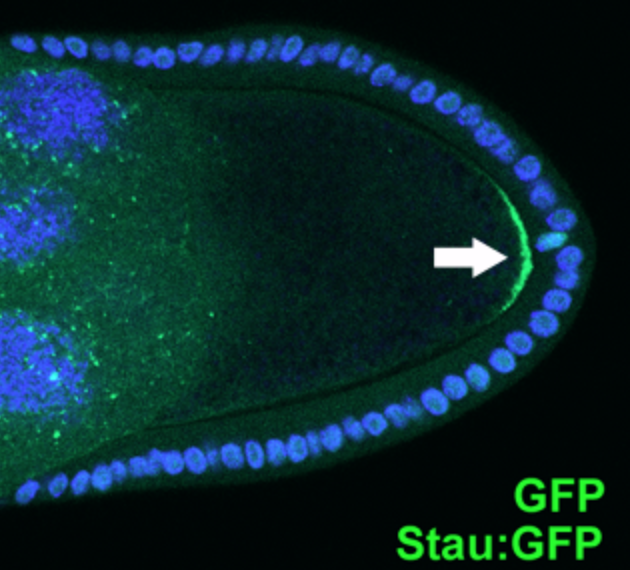
Polarized localization of Staufen protein (white arrow) in Drosophila stage 9 oocyte (Stau:GFP, DAPI).

== Examples of polarized cells ==
=== Epithelial cells ===
Epithelial cells adhere to one another through tight junctions, desmosomes and adherens junctions, forming sheets of cells that line the surface of the animal body and internal cavities (e.g., digestive tract and circulatory system). These cells have an apical-basal polarity defined by the apical membrane facing the outside surface of the body, or the lumen of internal cavities, and the basolateral membrane oriented away from the lumen. The basolateral membrane refers to both the lateral membrane where cell-cell junctions connect neighboring cells and to the basal membrane where cells are attached to the basement membrane, a thin sheet of extracellular matrix proteins that separates the epithelial sheet from underlying cells and connective tissue. Epithelial cells also exhibit planar cell polarity, in which specialized structures are orientated within the plane of the epithelial sheet. Some examples of planar cell polarity include the scales of fish being oriented in the same direction and similarly the feathers of birds, the fur of mammals, and the cuticular projections (sensory hairs, etc.) on the bodies and appendages of flies and other insects. Computational models have been suggested to simulate how a group of epithelial cells can form a variety of biological morphologies.

=== Neurons ===
A neuron receives signals from neighboring cells through branched, cellular extensions called dendrites. The neuron then propagates an electrical signal down a specialized axon extension from the basal pole to the synapse, where neurotransmitters are released to propagate the signal to another neuron or effector cell (e.g., muscle or gland). The polarity of the neuron thus facilitates the directional flow of information, which is required for communication between neurons and effector cells.

=== Migratory cells ===
Many cell types are capable of migration, such as leukocytes and fibroblasts, and in order for these cells to move in one direction, they must have a defined front and rear. At the front of the cell is the leading edge, which is often defined by a flat ruffling of the cell membrane called the lamellipodium or thin protrusions called filopodia. Here, actin polymerization in the direction of migration allows cells to extend the leading edge of the cell and to attach to the surface. At the rear of the cell, adhesions are disassembled and bundles of actin microfilaments, called stress fibers, contract and pull the trailing edge forward to keep up with the rest of the cell. Without this front-rear polarity, cells would be unable to coordinate directed migration.

=== Budding yeast ===
The budding yeast, Saccharomyces cerevisiae, is a model system for eukaryotic biology in which many of the fundamental elements of polarity development have been elucidated. Yeast cells share many features of cell polarity with other organisms, but feature fewer protein components. In yeast, polarity is biased to form at an inherited landmark, a patch of the protein Rsr1 in the case of budding, or a patch of Rax1 in mating projections. In the absence of polarity landmarks (i.e. in gene deletion mutants), cells can perform spontaneous symmetry breaking, in which the location of the polarity site is determined randomly. Spontaneous polarization still generates only a single bud site, which has been explained by positive feedback increasing polarity protein concentrations locally at the largest polarity patch while decreasing polarity proteins globally by depleting them. The master regulator of polarity in yeast is Cdc42, which is a member of the eukaryotic Ras-homologous Rho-family of GTPases, and a member of the super-family of small GTPases, which include Rop GTPases in plants and small GTPases in prokaryotes. For polarity sites to form, Cdc42 must be present and capable of cycling GTP, a process regulated by its guanine nucleotide exchange factor (GEF), Cdc24, and by its GTPase-activating proteins (GAPs). Cdc42 localization is further regulated by cell cycle queues, and a number of binding partners. A recent study to elucidate the connection between cell cycle timing and Cdc42 accumulation in the bud site uses optogenetics to control protein localization using light. During mating, these polarity sites can relocate. Mathematical modeling coupled with imaging experiments suggest the relocation is mediated by actin-driven vesicle delivery.

== Vertebrate development ==
The bodies of vertebrate animals are asymmetric along three axes: anterior-posterior (head to tail), dorsal-ventral (spine to belly), and left-right (for example, our heart is on the left side of our body). These polarities arise within the developing embryo through a combination of several processes: 1) asymmetric cell division, in which two daughter cells receive different amounts of cellular material (e.g. mRNA, proteins), 2) asymmetric localization of specific proteins or RNAs within cells (which is often mediated by the cytoskeleton), 3) concentration gradients of secreted proteins across the embryo such as Wnt, Nodal, and Bone Morphogenic Proteins (BMPs), and 4) differential expression of membrane receptors and ligands that cause lateral inhibition, in which the receptor-expressing cell adopts one fate and its neighbors another.

In addition to defining asymmetric axes in the adult organism, cell polarity also regulates both individual and collective cell movements during embryonic development such as apical constriction, invagination, and epiboly. These movements are critical for shaping the embryo and creating the complex structures of the adult body.

== Molecular basis ==
Cell polarity arises primarily through the localization of specific proteins to specific areas of the cell membrane. This localization often requires both the recruitment of cytoplasmic proteins to the cell membrane and polarized vesicle transport along cytoskeletal filaments to deliver transmembrane proteins from the golgi apparatus. Many of the molecules responsible for regulating cell polarity are conserved across cell types and throughout metazoan species. Examples include the PAR complex (Cdc42, PAR3/ASIP, PAR6, atypical protein kinase C), Crumbs complex (Crb, PALS, PATJ, Lin7), and Scribble complex (Scrib, Dlg, Lgl). These polarity complexes are localized at the cytoplasmic side of the cell membrane, asymmetrically within cells. For example, in epithelial cells, the PAR and Crumbs complexes are localized along the apical membrane, and the Scribble complex along the lateral membrane. Together with a group of signaling molecules called Rho GTPases, these polarity complexes can regulate vesicle transport and also control the localization of cytoplasmic proteins primarily by regulating the phosphorylation of phospholipids called phosphoinositides. Phosphoinositides serve as docking sites for proteins at the cell membrane, and their state of phosphorylation determines which proteins can bind.

== Polarity establishment ==
While many of the key polarity proteins are well conserved, different mechanisms exist to establish cell polarity in different cell types. Here, two main classes can be distinguished: (1) cells that are able to polarize spontaneously, and (2) cells that establish polarity based on intrinsic or environmental cues.

Spontaneous symmetry breaking can be explained by amplification of stochastic fluctuations of molecules due to non-linear chemical kinetics. The mathematical basis for this biological phenomenon was established by Alan Turing in his 1953 paper 'The chemical basis of morphogenesis.' While Turing initially attempted to explain pattern formation in a multicellular system, similar mechanisms can also be applied to intracellular pattern formation. Briefly, if a network of at least two interacting chemicals (in this case, proteins) exhibits certain types of reaction kinetics, as well as differential diffusion, stochastic concentration fluctuations can give rise to the formation of large-scale stable patterns, thus bridging from a molecular length scale to a cellular or even tissue scale.

A prime example for the second type of polarity establishment, which relies on extracellular or intracellular cues, is the C. elegans zygote. Here, mutual inhibition between two sets of proteins guides polarity establishment and maintenance. On the one hand, PAR-3, PAR-6 and aPKC (called anterior PAR proteins) occupy both the plasma membrane and cytoplasm prior to symmetry breaking. PAR-1, the C. elegans-specific ring-finger-containing protein PAR-2, and LGL-1 (called posterior PAR proteins) are present mostly in the cytoplasm. The male centrosome provides a cue, which breaks an initially homogenous membrane distribution of anterior PARs by inducing cortical flows. These are thought to advect anterior PARs towards one side of the cell, allowing posterior PARs to bind to other pole (posterior). Anterior and posterior PAR proteins then maintain polarity until cytokinesis by mutually excluding each other from their respective cell membrane areas.

== See also ==
- Epithelial polarity
- Cell migration
- Embryogenesis
- Embryonic development
- Asymmetric cell division
- 3D cell culture
- Cell culture assay
- Madin-Darby canine kidney cells
