= 3D cell culture =

Free-floating three-dimensional culture of cells

A 3D cell culture is an artificially created environment in which biological cells are permitted to grow or interact with their surroundings in all three dimensions. Unlike 2D environments (e.g. a Petri dish), a 3D cell culture allows cells in vitro to grow in all directions, similar to how they would in vivo. These three-dimensional cultures are usually grown in bioreactors, small capsules in which the cells can grow into spheroids, or 3D cell colonies. Approximately 300 spheroids are usually cultured per bioreactor.

== Background ==
3D cell cultures have been used in research for several decades. One of the first recorded approaches for their development was at the beginning of the 20th century, with the efforts of Alexis Carrel to develop methods for prolonged in vitro tissue cultures. Early studies in the 80's, led by Mina Bissell from the Lawrence Berkeley National Laboratory, highlighted the importance of 3D techniques for creating accurate in vitro culturing models. This work focused on the importance of the extracellular matrix and the ability of cultures in artificial 3D matrices to produce physiologically relevant multicellular structures, such as acinar structures in healthy and cancerous breast tissue models. These techniques have been applied to in vitro disease models used to evaluate cellular responses to pharmaceutical compounds.

Eric Simon, in a 1988 NIH SBIR grant report, showed that electrospinning could be used to produce nano- and submicron-scale polystyrene and polycarbonate fibrous mats (now known as scaffolds) specifically intended for use as in vitro cell substrates. This early use of electrospun fibrous lattices for cell culture and tissue engineering showed that various cell types including Human Foreskin Fibroblasts (HFF), transformed Human Carcinoma (HEp-2), and Mink Lung Epithelium (MLE) would adhere to and proliferate upon the fibers. It was noted that as opposed to the flattened morphology typically seen in 2D culture, cells grown on the electrospun fibers exhibited a more histotypic rounded 3-dimensional morphology generally observed in vivo.

3D cell culture, by emulating essential aspects of the in vivo environment, including interactions between cells and the extracellular matrix, allows for the faithful recreation of structural architecture and specialized functions in normal tissues or tumors in a laboratory setting. This approach authentically models the conditions and processes of living tissues, producing responses akin to those observed in vivo. Since its inception in the 1970s, 3D cell culture has provided significant insights into the mechanisms regulating tissue homeostasis and cancer. Moreover, it has expedited translational research in the realms of cancer biology and tissue engineering. To date a major limiting factor in the size of constructs has been unprogrammed cell death called necrosis.

== Properties ==
In living tissue, cells exist in 3D microenvironments with intricate cell-cell and cell-matrix interactions and complex transport dynamics for nutrients and cells. Standard 2D, or monolayer, cell cultures are inadequate representations of this environment, which often makes them unreliable predictors of in vivo drug efficacy and toxicity. 3D spheroids more closely resemble in vivo tissue in terms of cellular communication and the development of extracellular matrices. These matrices help the cells to be able to move within their spheroid similar to the way cells would move in living tissue. The spheroids are thus improved models for cell migration, differentiation, survival, and growth. Furthermore, 3D cell cultures provide more accurate depiction of cell polarization, since in 2D, the cells can only be partially polarized. Moreover, cells grown in 3D exhibit different gene expression than those grown in 2D.

The third dimension of cell growth provides more contact space for mechanical inputs and for cell adhesion, which is necessary for integrin ligation, cell contraction and even intracellular signalling. Normal solute diffusion and binding to effector proteins (like growth factors and enzymes) is also reliant on the 3D cellular matrix, so it is critical for the establishment of tissue scale solute concentration gradients

For the purposes of drug toxicology screening, it is much more useful to test gene expression of in vitro cells grown in 3D than 2D, since the gene expression of the 3D spheroids will more closely resemble gene expression in vivo. Lastly, 3D cell cultures have greater stability and longer lifespans than cell cultures in 2D. This means that they are more suitable for long-term studies and for demonstrating long-term effects of the drug. 3D environments also allow the cells to grow undisturbed. In 2D, the cells must undergo regular trypsinization to provide them with sufficient nutrients for normal cell growth. 3D spheroids have been cultured in a lab setting for up to 302 days while still maintaining healthy, non-cancerous growth.

In the interdisciplinary research of biology and aerospace, the 3D printed-scaffolds are also being used for protecting cells from the effect of gravity during the launching.

== Classification of 3D culture methods ==
There are a large number of commercially available culturing tools that claim to provide the advantages of 3D cell culture. In general, the platforms can be classified in two types of 3D culturing methods: scaffold techniques and scaffold-free techniques.

A model showing three examples of techniques used for culturing cells in a 3D environment.

=== Scaffold techniques ===
Scaffold techniques include the use of solid scaffolds, hydrogels and other materials. In a recent study potentiality of human CD34+ stem cells explored by generating in vitro agarose gel 3D model to understand the bone ossification process. Scaffolds can be used to generate microtissue 3D model by culturing fibroblasts outside of tumour cells, mimicking the tumor stroma interaction.

The effectiveness of scaffolds in various applications, particularly in tissue engineering, is significantly impacted by factors such as pore distribution, exposed surface area, and porosity. The quantity and arrangement of these elements influence both the depth and rate at which cells penetrate the scaffold volume, the structure of the resulting extracellular matrix, and ultimately, the success of the regenerative process. Scaffolds can be produced with diverse architectures depending on the manufacturing method, leading to either random or precisely designed pore distribution. Recently, advanced computer-controlled rapid prototyping techniques have been employed to create scaffolds with well-organized geometries.

==== Hydrogels ====
As the natural extracellular matrix (ECM) is important in the survival, proliferation, differentiation and migration of the cells, different hydrogel matrices mimicking natural ECM structure are considered as potential approaches towards in vivo –like cell culturing. Hydrogels are composed of interconnected pores with high water retention, which enables efficient transport of e.g. nutrients and gases. Several different types of hydrogels from natural and synthetic materials are available for 3D cell culture, including e.g. animal ECM extract hydrogels, protein hydrogels, peptide hydrogels, polymer hydrogels, and wood-based nanocellulose hydrogel.

The approach to crafting the optimal ECM replica relies on the specific characteristics of the culture in question and typically involves employing diverse and independent chemical processes. For example, the utilization of photolabile chemistries can lead to the erosion of specific regions within a gel, and subsequently exposing these areas allows for the application of adhesive ligands, promoting cell adhesion and migration. The development of more intricate frameworks is anticipated, comprising interwoven networks of chemistries under the control of both cells and users. In essence, there is no singular network capable of faithfully emulating the intricate ECM of every tissue type. However, a thoughtful integration of bioinspired cues into synthetic gels holds the potential to yield resilient and versatile scaffolds applicable across various cell culture systems.

=== Scaffold-free techniques ===
Scaffold free techniques employ another approach independent from the use scaffold. Scaffold-free methods include e.g. the use of low adhesion plates, hanging drop plates, micropatterned surfaces, and rotating bioreactors, magnetic levitation, and magnetic 3D bioprinting.

==== Spheroids ====
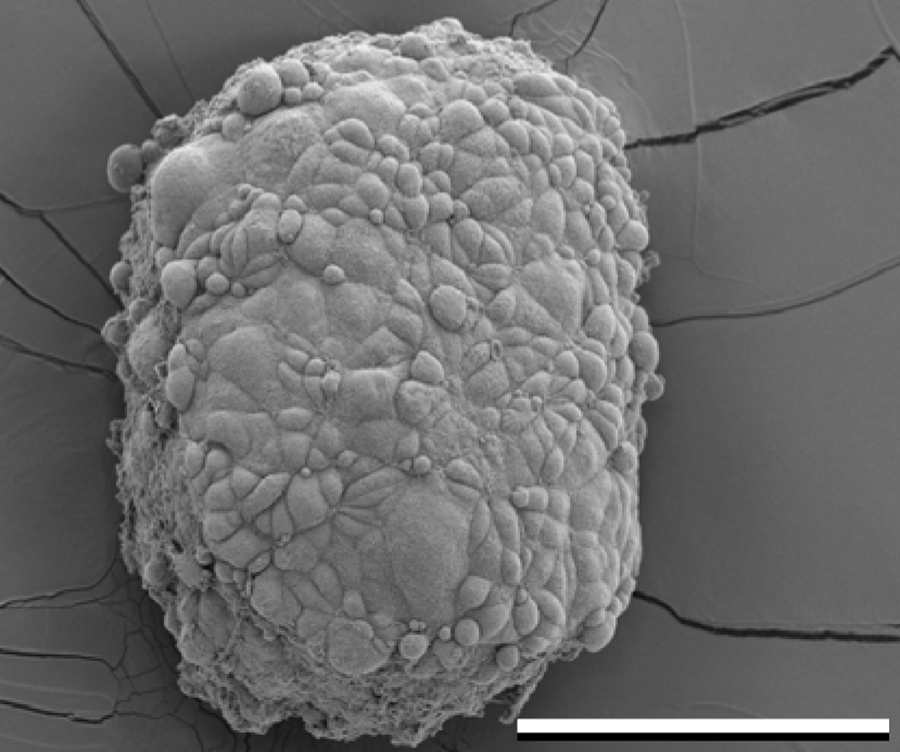
Electron microscopy of a mesothelioma spheroid (NCI-H226). Scale bars, 200 μm.

Spheroids are a type of three-dimensional cell modeling that better simulate a live cell's environmental conditions compared to a two-dimensional cell model, specifically with the reactions between cells and the reactions between cells and the matrix. Due to the strong interactions between the cells and the extracellular matrix in the spheroid, the permeability is limited, generating physiologically relevant gradients of e.g. nutrients and oxygen through the spheroid. Spheroids are useful in the study of changing physiological characteristics of cells, the difference in the structure of healthy cells and tumor cells, and the changes cells undergo when forming a tumor. Spheroids co-cultured with tumor and healthy cells were used to simulate how cancerous cells interact with normal cells. Spheroids can also be co-cultured with fibroblasts to mimic tumor-stroma interaction. Spheroids can be grown with a few different methods. One common method is to use low cell adhesion plates, typically a 96 well plate, to mass-produce spheroid cultures, where the aggregates form in the rounded bottom of the cell plates. Spheroids can also be cultured using the hanging drop method involving forming cell aggregates in drops that hang from the surface of a cell plate. Other methods under investigation include the use of rotating wall vessel bioreactors, which spins and cultures the cells when they are constantly in free fall and forms aggregates in layers Recently, some protocols have been standardized to produce uniform and reliable spheroids. Researchers had also explored standardized, economical and reproducible methods for 3D cell culture. To improve reproducibility and transparency in spheroid experiments, an international consortium developed MISpheroID (Minimal Information in Spheroid Identity).

==== Clusteroids ====
clusteroids are a type of three-dimensional cell modeling similar to spheroids but are distinguished by their creation method; grown as clusters of cells in an aqueous two-phase system of water-in-water Pickering emulsion using interfacial tension and osmotic shrinkage to pack the cells into dense clusters which are then cultured in a hydrogel into tissues or organoids.

In the absence of blood vessels, oxygen permeability is impaired during necrotic nucleus formation and this prevents the ex vivo use of 3D cell culture. There is an emulsion template that can overcome this problem. This approach allowed researchers to adjust the cell composition to attain the ideal conditions for promoting the synthesis of diverse angiogenic protein markers within the co-cultured clusteroids. HUVEC cells exhibit a reaction to the presence of Hep-G2 cells and their derivatives by generating endothelial cell sprouts in Matrigel, all without the external introduction of vascular endothelial growth factor (VEGF) or other agents that induce angiogenesis. The replication of this cultivation technique is straightforward for generating various cell co-culture spheroids. The w/w Pickering emulsion template greatly aids in constructing 3D co-culture models, offering significant potential for applications in drug testing and tissue engineering.

==== Bioreactors ====
The bioreactors used for 3D cell cultures are small plastic cylindrical chambers that are specifically engineered for the purpose of growing cells in three dimensions. The bioreactor uses bioactive synthetic materials such as polyethylene terephthalate membranes to surround the spheroid cells in an environment that maintains high levels of nutrients. They are easy to open and close, so that cell spheroids can be removed for testing, yet the chamber is able to maintain 100% humidity throughout. This humidity is important to achieve maximum cell growth and function. The bioreactor chamber is part of a larger device that rotates to ensure equal cell growth in each direction across three dimensions.
MC2 Biotek has developed a bioreactor to incubate proto-tissue that uses gas exchange to maintain high oxygen levels within the cell chamber. This is an improvement over previous bioreactors because the higher oxygen levels help the cell grow and undergo normal cell respiration.

Collaborative efforts between tissue engineering (TE) firms, academic institutions, and industrial partners can enhance the transformation of research-oriented bioreactors into efficient commercial manufacturing systems. Academic collaborators contribute foundational aspects, while industrial partners provide essential automation elements, ensuring compliance with regulatory standards and user-friendliness. Established consortia in Europe, such as REMEDI, AUTOBONE, and STEPS, focus on developing automated systems to streamline the engineering of autologous cell-based grafts. The aim is to meet regulatory criteria and ensure cost-effectiveness, making tissue-engineered products more clinically accessible and advancing the translational paradigm of TE from research to a competitive commercial field.

== Microfluidics ==
The utilization of microfluidic technology facilitates the generation of intricate micro-scale structures and the precise manipulation of parameters, thereby emulating the in vivo cellular milieu. The integration of microfluidic technology with 3D cell culture holds considerable potential for applications that seek to replicate in vivo tissue characteristics, notably exemplified by the evolving organ-on-a-chip system. The various cell structures in the human body must be vascularized to receive the nutrients and gas exchange in order to survive. Similarly, 3D cell cultures in vitro require certain levels of fluid circulation, which can be problematic for dense, 3D cultures where cells may not all have adequate exposure to nutrients. This is particularly important in hepatocyte cultures because the liver is a highly vascularized organ. One study cultured hepatocytes and vascular cells together on a collagen gel scaffold between microfluidic channels, and compared growth of cells in static and flowing environments, and showed the need for models with tissues and a microvascular network. Another study showed that hanging-drop based spheroid co-culture device can be useful, generating two different cell spheroids on adjacent channels of microfluidic hanging drop device, and co-culturing spheroids with merging droplets, to monitor tumor-induced angiogenesis.

Microfluidic 3D cell culture, with its potential applications in biomedical research and tissue engineering, is an area of growing interest. However, its advancement is accompanied by several formidable challenges. One such challenge pertains to the difficulty in accessing cultured cells within microsystems, coupled with the intricate nature of sample extraction for subsequent assays. Additionally, the development of methodologies and devices dedicated to in vivo-like cell metabolism and functions study, as well as drug discovery, represents a significant hurdle for microfluidic 3D cell culture devices. Another noteworthy impediment is the limited availability of microfabrication instrumentation in conventional biology laboratories. Moreover, the commercialization of mature and user-friendly microfluidic devices poses a substantial challenge, hindering their accessibility to biologists. Lastly, while biologists often seek high-throughput assay tools with optimal reproducibility, microfluidics encounters technical limitations in meeting these demands, despite the potential feasibility of parallel assays.

== High-throughput screening ==
Advanced development of 3D models for high-throughput screening in high density formats has recently been achievable due to technological achievements related to increased microplate density. These can be found in 384 and 1536-well formats that are cell repellent, cost effective, and amenable to fully automated screening platforms. Two options that afford 1536-well formats are available from either Greiner Bio-One using the m3D Magnetic 3D bioprinting and Corning Life Sciences which incorporates an ultra-low attachment surface coating, along with a microcavity geometry and gravity to create 3D models. Due to the rapid and affordable methods and technologies that have been developed for 3D screening, parallel high-throughput screening approaches to test isogenic pairs of oncogene related mutants versus wildtype have been enabled. Moreover, High-throughput screening techniques play a pivotal role in connecting the realms of pharmacology and toxicology within the framework of 3D cell culture.

== Pharmacology and toxicology ==
A primary purpose of growing cells in 3D scaffolds and as 3D cell spheroids in vitro is to test pharmacokinetic and pharmacodynamic effects of drugs and nanomaterials in preclinical trials. Toxicology studies have shown 3D cell cultures to be nearly on par with in vivo studies for the purposes of testing toxicity of drug compounds. When comparing LD_{50} values for 6 common drugs: acetaminophen, amiodarone, diclofenac, metformin, phenformin, and valproic acid, the 3D spheroid values correlated directly with those from in vivo studies. Although 2D cell cultures have previously been used to test for toxicity along with in vivo studies, the 3D spheroids are better at testing chronic exposure toxicity because of their longer life spans. The matrix in 3D Spheroids causes cells to maintain actin filaments and is more relevant physiologically in cytoskeletal organization and cell polarity and shape of human cells. The three-dimensional arrangement allows the cultures to provide a model that more accurately resembles human tissue in vivo without using animal test subjects.

The current protocols for evaluating drug candidates and assessing toxicity heavily depend on outcomes derived from early-stage in vitro cell-based assays, with the expectation that these assays faithfully capture critical aspects of in vivo pharmacology and toxicology. Various in vitro designs have been fine-tuned for high throughput to enhance screening efficiency, allowing exhaustive libraries of potential pharmacologically relevant or potentially toxic molecules to undergo scrutiny for cell signals indicative of tissue damage or aligned with therapeutic objectives. Innovative approaches to multiplexed cell-based assay designs, involving the selection of specific cell types, signaling pathways, and reporters, have become standard practice.

Despite these advancements, a considerable percentage of new chemical and biological entities (NCEs/NBEs) encounter setbacks in late-stage human drug testing. Some receive regulatory "black box" warnings, while others are withdrawn from the market due to safety concerns post-regulatory approval. This recurrent pattern underscores the inadequacy of in vitro cell-based assays and subsequent preclinical in vivo studies in furnishing comprehensive pharmacological and toxicity data or reliable predictive capacity for comprehending the in vivo performance of drug candidates.

The absence of a dependable translational assay toolkit for pharmacology and toxicology contributes to the high cost and inefficiency of transitioning from initial in vitro cell-based screens to in vivo testing and subsequent clinical approvals. Particular emphasis is placed on their capacity to retain essential cell and molecular interactions, as well as physiological parameters influencing cell phenotypes and responses to bioactive agents. The distinctive advantages and challenges associated with these models are scrutinized, with a specific focus on their suitability for cell-based assays and their predictive capabilities, crucial for establishing accurate correlations with in vivo mechanisms of drug toxicity.

While assessing safety and efficacy, these models are well equipped to model a wide range of disease states. Each of these models has advantages and limitations that require model development and data interpretation. Public-private partnerships are critical to advance and stimulate research in this area.

== Criticisms ==
Existing 3D methods are not without limitations, including scalability, reproducibility, sensitivity, and compatibility with high-throughput screening (HTS) instruments. Cell-based HTS relies on rapid determination of cellular response to drug interaction, such as dose dependent cell viability, cell-cell/cell-matrix interaction, and/or cell migration, but the available assays are not optimized for 3D cell culturing. Another challenge faced by 3D cell culturing is the limited amount of data and publications that address mechanisms and correlations of drug interaction, cell differentiation, and cell-signalling in these 3D environments. None of the 3D methods have yet replaced 2D culturing on a large scale, including in the drug development process; although the number of 3D cell culturing publications is increasing rapidly, the current limited biochemical characterization of 3D tissue diminishes the adoption of new methods.

There are also problems using spheroids as a model for cancerous tissue. Although beneficial for 3D tissue culture, tumor spheroids have been criticized for being challenging or impossible to "manipulate gradients of soluble molecules in [3D spheroid] constructs, and to characterize cells in these complex gradients", unlike the paper-supported 3D cell culture for tissue-based bioassays explored by Ratmir et al. Further challenges associated with complex 3D cell culture techniques include: imaging due to large scaffold sizes and incompatibility with many fluorescence microscopes, flow cytometry because it requires the dissociation of spheroids into a single-cell suspension, and the automation of liquid handling.

Tissue engineering requires 3D cellular scaffolds. As biomaterials, various natural and synthetic polymer hydrogels have been used by scientists to design 3D scaffolds. Since this barrier is a structure that mimics the natural ECM microenvironment, synthetic scaffolds may be more useful for studying specific tumorigenic steps. Finally, it is suggested that the most suitable three-dimensional models should be carefully selected according to specific targets.

== See also ==
- Cell culture
- Cell lines
- Cell culture assay
- Hydrogel
- Madin-Darby Canine Kidney cell line
- Microphysiometry
