= Polyvalent influenza vaccine =

Vaccine against multiple flu strains

Polyvalent influenza vaccine is a type of influenza vaccine that provides immunity against more than one type of antigen. In the second week after receiving the flu shot, the body's immune system is triggered by the antigens so the body starts producing antibodies. These antibodies help fight against influenza viruses. Influenza symptoms and deaths can be prevented by getting an influenza vaccine every year. Currently circulating influenza strains that can cause seasonal epidemics include influenza A viruses, which can be further divided into subtype A(H1N1) and A(H3N2), and influenza B viruses.

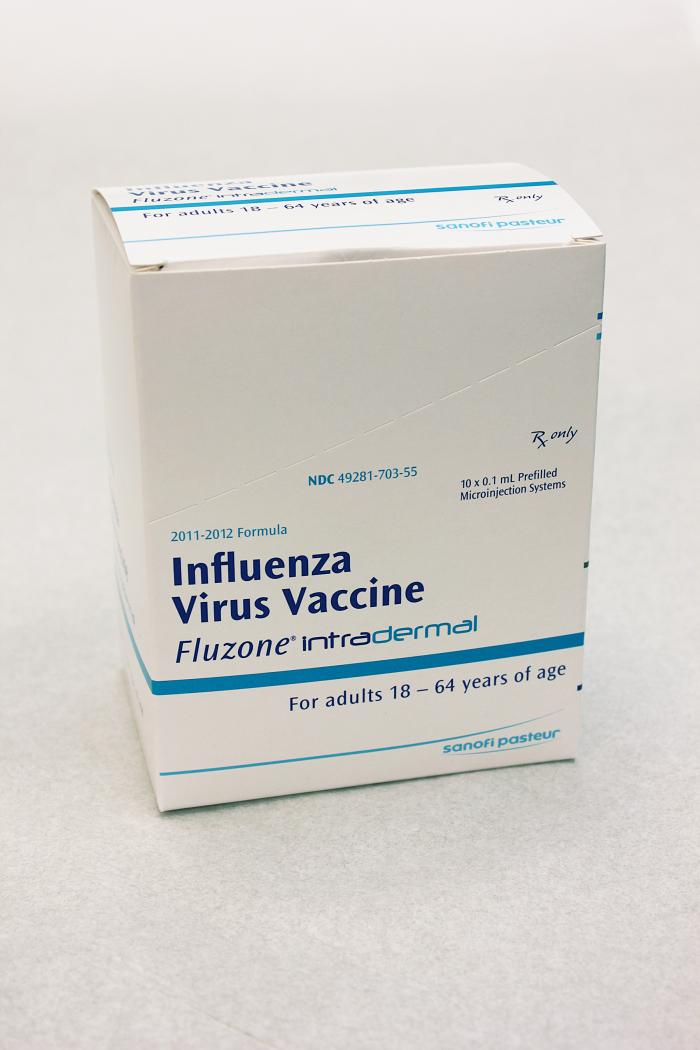
Figure 1 shows the trivalent flu vaccine named Fluzone Intra-dermal within the 2011-2012 flu season. Since the 2015-2016 flu season, one more B-strain lineage virus has been added, and the vaccine became quadrivalent.

Influenza viruses were first identified in 1933 when a group of scientists, Wilson Smith, P.P. Laidlaw, and C.H. Andrewes, discovered that there was no bacteria infection from the throat samples of patients infected by influenza. They concluded that a virus caused the disease. After that, the researchers Thomas Francis and Jonas Salk developed the first influenza vaccine at the University of Michigan. The vaccine was tested for safety and effectiveness in the United States Army. It was afterward licensed for use. However, researchers had suspected that there was more than one viral strain of influenza as some patients did not develop antibodies to the strain discovered in 1933. By undergoing many investigations, the researchers discovered the influenza B virus. Thus, the influenza B virus was added to the vaccines and packaged as a bivalent vaccine in 1942.

There are multiple types of polyvalent influenza vaccines available in the market, including egg-based, cell-based, and recombinant influenza vaccines. The World Health Organisation (WHO) will announce the viral strains to be included in flu vaccines annually. Starting from 2021/2022, all influenza vaccines are quadrivalent, containing two influenza A and two influenza B antigens. These are called quadrivalent influenza vaccines (QIVs). Vaccination may also cause a range of adverse effects on patients, from fever, injection site pain to anaphylaxis, which is a severe allergic reaction.

== Types of polyvalent influenza vaccines ==
There are a wide variety of influenza vaccines, classified by their types of different manufacturing processes.

=== Egg-based influenza vaccines ===
Egg-based influenza vaccines are produced by the oldest production process. This method has been used for over 70 years. First, the viruses are cloned into fertilised chicken eggs and incubated for a while. This usually last for several days, so the wanted viruses are allowed to replicate. The target viruses are then harvested from eggs, inactivated, or killed. They were then purified as vaccines.

The advantage of egg-based influenza vaccines is the low cost as the production does not require a sophisticated setup. However, the supply of these vaccines is dependent on the supply of eggs. Thus, the production process usually lasts for 6 to 8 months. Moreover, changes may occur while growing flu viruses in hen eggs. These are called egg-adapted changes that lead to differences in genes and structures between the candidate viruses in the eggs and the circulating, 'wild' viruses. As a result, less effective antibodies are made by the immune system of humans. Hence, egg-based vaccines may have lower efficacy in flu prevention.

=== Cell-based influenza vaccine ===
'Cell-based' vaccines referred to the vaccines that the virus strains are cultured in mammalian cells instead of in hen's eggs. Therefore, it can be used in people with egg allergies who are contraindicated in having egg-based vaccination. The selected vaccine viruses are combined into mammalian cells. One possible type is Madin-Darby Canine Kidney (MDCK) cells. After allowing the viruses to reproduce for a couple of days, they are harvested, killed, and purified. In contrast to egg-based influenza vaccines, polyvalent influenza vaccines derived from mammalian cells are protected from egg-adaptation changes. As a result, the viruses cultured in mammalian cells will share more structural similarities with prevalent viruses. Theoretically, vaccines produced in cell culture may be more effective than vaccines produced in hen eggs. By making a comparison of the efficacy of cell-based and egg-based vaccines in a systematic review of English and Spanish-language studies, it was abundantly clear from the findings that there were no differences in the effectiveness of these two kinds of influenza vaccines. Another comparative study reflected that the efficacy of quadrivalent vaccines originated from cells was not superior to the egg-based quadrivalent vaccines among the elderly population aged ≥ 65 in the United States.

The advantage of cell-based vaccine is that it will not be affected by the egg shortage. It is also more scalable but it has higher production cost than egg-based vaccines.

=== Recombinant influenza vaccine ===
Recombinant vaccine does not require flu viruses or fertilised eggs in the manufacturing process. It was first licensed by the U.S. Food and Drug Administration in 2013. Children under 18 are not recommended to use recombinant vaccine as the administration of recombinant vaccine in people aged 18 or below is not approved.

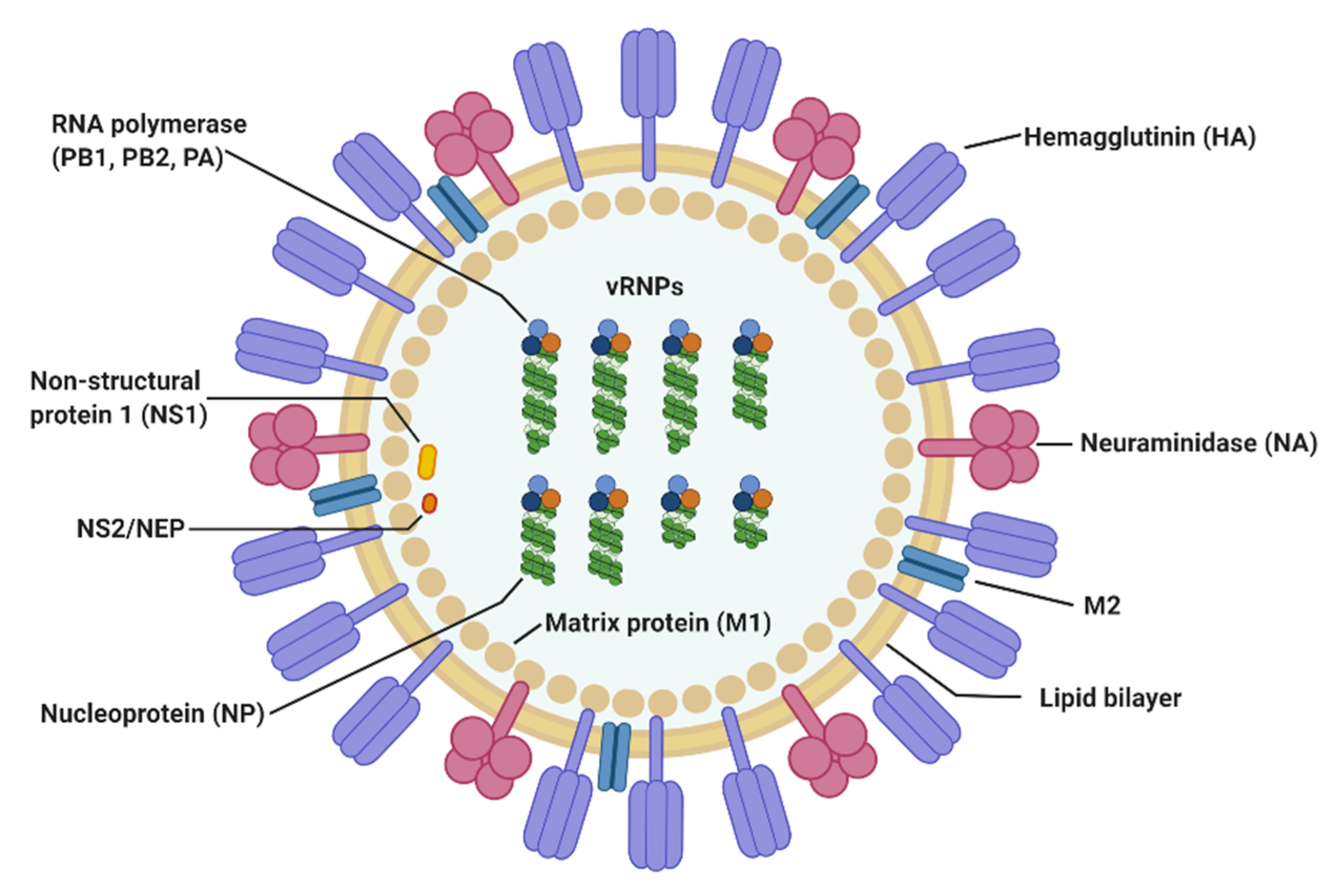
Figure 3 showed the structure of an influenza virus. The hemagglutinin (HA) surface proteins feature the influenza virus. The HA antigens of seasonal virus strains are the target for the influenza vaccines to trigger an immune response in the human body.

During the manufacturing process, the virus' gene is first obtained. It contains the information for the expression of the HA antigen which characterizes a flu virus. The antigen will trigger human immunity to produce antibodies and result in flu symptoms in our body. By using the recombinant technology, the HA gene is then inoculated with a baculovirus as a viral vector, which infects invertebrates. To guide the rapid HA antigen expression, the viral vector help deliver the flu HA antigen genes to the targeted host cells. This antigen is harvested, collected in bulk and purified, and then packaged as a recombinant flu vaccine.

The recombinant influenza vaccine has been proven to be effective in older age groups. In the clinical trial approved and funded by the CDC in 2017–2018, the recombinant quadrivalent influenza vaccine generated a greater fold rise of antibody response than inactivated trivalent high-dose influenza vaccine in elderly ranging from 65 to 74 years old. The recombinant quadrivalent vaccines are also more protective against a larger range of circulating viruses. In another randomized clinical trial conducted in 2014- 2015, the effectiveness of the recombinant vaccine and egg-based inactivated flu vaccine was compared in a population aged 50 or above. In contrast with the egg-based vaccine, the recombinant flu vaccine significantly reduced the risk of influenza-like illness by 30%.

== Effectiveness of trivalent vaccines vs quadrivalent vaccines ==
Based on worldwide virological surveillance, the World Health Organization (WHO) makes recommendations about vaccine formulation every year. Annual trivalent influenza vaccinations (TIVs) only contain one influenza B virus and two influenza A antigens (H1N1 and H3N2) previously. Meanwhile, the efficacy of trivalent vaccines depends on how closely the vaccination viral strains match the prevalent viral antigens. Nonetheless, there were several mismatches of the influenza B virus between the vaccines and the circulating viruses in the past 20 years. In response to this, WHO suggested including one more influenza B surface protein so QIVs were developed to provide people with more protection from influenza B lineages. Regarding the currently available literature, the QIVs slightly reduce influenza B-related morbidity as well as mortality ranging from 0.15% - 6.5% when compared with TIVs. Therefore, QIVs are proven to be more effective in protecting people from influenza B with the addition of one influenza B virus. Thus, QIVs can save healthcare costs which can partially cover their higher price compared with TIVs, so QIVs are more cost-effective than TIVs. However, the cost-effectiveness of QIVs depends mainly on the matching of influenza B virus strains with circulating strains and the prices of QIVs over TIVs. In other words, the cost-effectiveness of QIVs can vary by season.

== Guidelines ==
=== Vaccine eligible group ===
Influenza vaccines are suitable for most, and persons over six months of age are advised to get a vaccination. Some types of influenza vaccines may not be approved for all ages. Some flu vaccines may also be potentially more effective than others in certain age groups. For example, the United States Centers for Disease Control and Prevention (CDC) preferentially recommended quadrivalent vaccines like high-dose flu vaccines, recombinant influenza vaccines, and adjuvanted flu vaccines to people of 65 or above.

Before injection, one should make sure the type of vaccine is suitable for their age. People who have egg allergy, chronic health conditions, or are currently pregnant can get a vaccination.

=== Vaccine ineligible group ===
However, there are exceptions for people who should avoid some types of vaccines, and some extreme cases should completely avoid all influenza vaccines. For example, children under 6 months are too small to get a vaccination and the quadrivalent recombinant vaccine is not approved for people aged under 18. Furthermore, people with a serious allergy to any ingredient in a flu vaccine, such as antibiotics or gelatin, should not get a vaccination.

People should consult a healthcare professional before getting an influenza vaccination if they are allergic to eggs or any ingredients in the vaccine, such as antibiotics or gelatin; or if they are diagnosed with Guillain-Barré Syndrome (GBS), a severe paralyzing illness; or if any serious allergy was observed in previous vaccinations.

== Adverse effects ==
=== Local and systemic reaction ===
Some usual adverse events may happen the first day or two after injection. They include tiredness, headache and chills, nausea and vomiting, fever (body temperature higher than 37.8 °C), and injection site pain and tenderness. Take a normal dose of paracetamol if necessary. If the fever lasts longer than 48 hours, approach medical professionals as it may be caused by other infections.

For the elderly receiving high-dose polyvalent vaccines, side effects are more likely to develop the week after injection, lasting for 1–3 days.

=== Rare side effects ===
Guillain–Barré syndrome (GBS)

GBS is an inflammatory disorder that causes muscle weakness and paralysis. Only 1-2 cases of GBS were reported per million influenza vaccines administered.

=== Extreme allergic reactions ===
Some severe symptoms of anaphylaxis may occur after injection, including shortness of breath, wheezing, swelling, dizziness, and a fast heartbeat. These symptoms are very rare and most likely start to develop within a few minutes to a few hours after the injection.

If any serious allergic symptoms or emergent situation emerges after vaccination, the patient should call the ambulance and visit the nearest hospital.
