= Aline Miller =

Professor of Chemistry

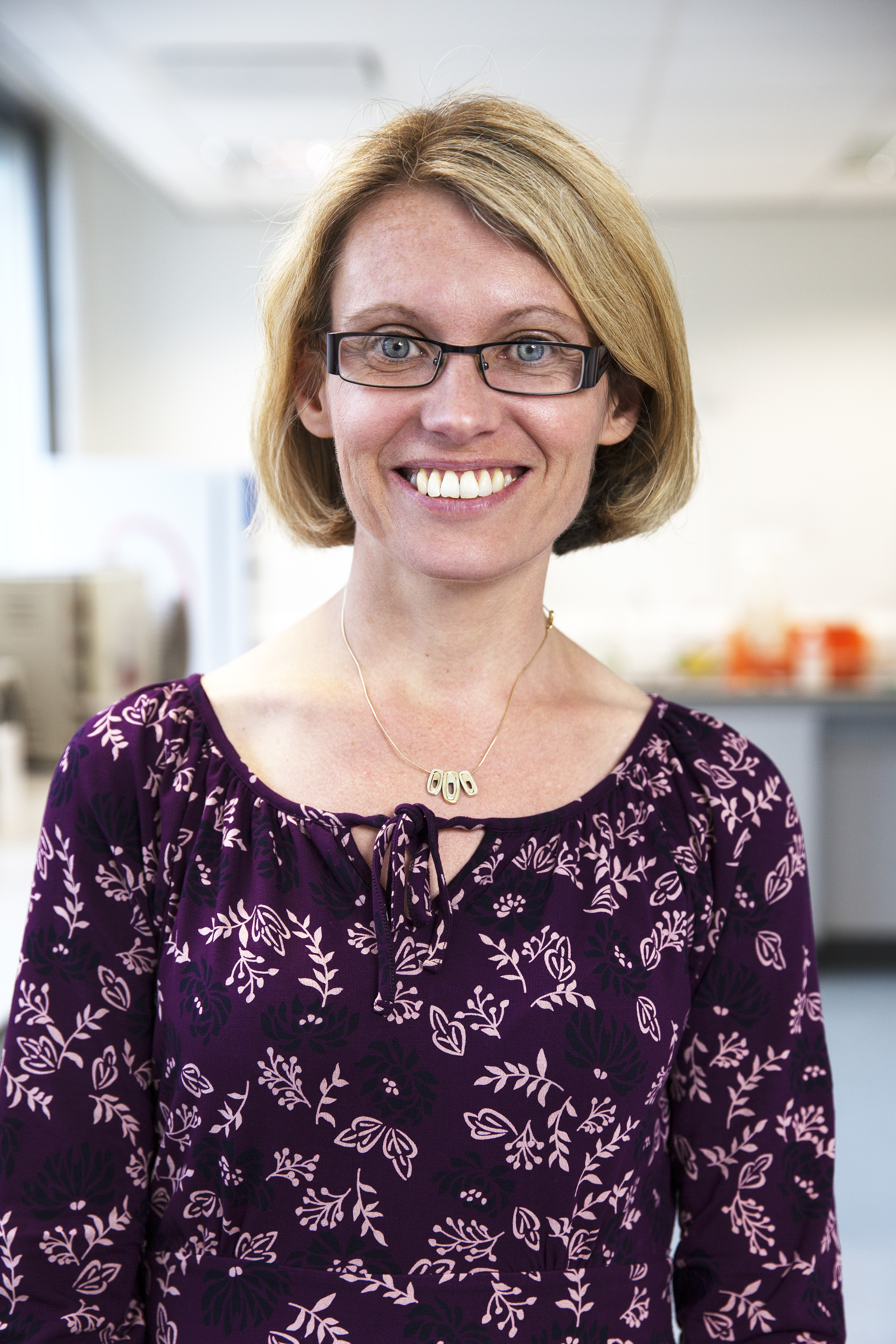
- Aline Miller in 2018
- Born: Aline Fiona Miller; October 1975 (age 50)
- Education: Durham University; University of Strathclyde
- Spouse: Alberto Saiani
- Scientific career
- Fields: Self-assembly; Polymers; Peptides; Biomaterials; Fluid surfaces
- Workplaces: University of Manchester; University of Cambridge; University of Manchester Institute of Science and Technology
- Thesis: Organisation and dynamics of well-defined graft copolymers at the air-water interface (2000)
- Doctoral advisor: Randal Richards
- Website: www.research.manchester.ac.uk/portal/aline.miller.html

Aline Fiona Miller (born 1975) is a Professor of Biomolecular Engineering at the University of Manchester. She specialises in the characterisation of polymer, biopolymer and peptides, using neutron and x-ray scattering, as well as the development of functionalised nanostructures for regenerative medicine and toxicology testing.

== Early life and education ==
Miller studied Chemistry at the University of Strathclyde and graduated in 1997. She was an undergraduate exchange student at Franklin & Marshall College. Miller joined Durham University as a post graduate student, earning a PhD in 2000 under the supervision of Randal Richards. Miller worked on graft copolymers, which included polynorbornene and polyethylene oxide, and studied their organisation at air-water interfaces. After completing her doctorate, Miller moved to New Hall, Cambridge, where she was appointed a Junior Research Fellow and worked with Athene Donald on cellulose. She was inspired to have a career in research during this fellowship.

== Research and career ==
Miller joined the University of Manchester Institute of Science and Technology (UMIST) in 2002. She was made a full Professor in 2014. She currently works in CEAS - Academic & Research Department of Chemical Engineering & Analytical Science at the Manchester Institute of Biotechnology. She investigates the behaviour of molecules at different interfaces, including the air-liquid and liquid-liquid interface. Surfactants and polymers can be used to promote or inhibit the crystallisation of small molecules, for example the use of hydroxyl based polymers in the crystallisation of ice cream. To mimic how fish use macromolecules to stop their blood freezing, Miller combines antifreeze proteins with ice crystals. In 2004 Miller established the University of Manchester Polymers & Peptides Research Group. Here she works on the characterisation of polymer, biopolymer and peptides, using neutron and x-ray scattering. The in-depth characterisation of these materials allows Miller to tailor them for specific applications.

Miller also works in biomedical engineering, creating three-dimensional scaffolds through the control of proteins and peptides. She explores the relationship between mesoscopic structure, material properties and cell response. She has studied how proteins self-assemble, including what causes them to unfold and form fibril structures. The morphology (roughness, porosity) and mechanical properties (such as Young's modulus and viscosity) can be controlled through self-assembly. The self-assembling peptides can be conjugated with polymers that are sensitive to pH and temperature. Through the synthesis of short peptides with various amino acid sequences the Miller group are studying the self-assembly of Beta sheets. She has developed a biocompatible, biodegradable cardiac patch, created from a thick porous scaffold coated with a material that mimics the extracellular matrix. She also studies the degradation mechanism of these materials.

Miller was awarded a small grant from the University of Manchester to develop the synthesis of peptide-based hydrogels. The synthetic peptide hydrogels were so successful that she set up the spin-out company PeptiGelDesign, a group which worked to commercialise hydrogel technologies. Since 2008 PeptiGelDesign have raised over £6 million in funding. Recognising the reach and potential of PeptiGelDesign, the company relaunched as Manchester BIOGEL in 2018, continuing to offer peptide-based hydrogels amongst other biomaterials. The hydrogels can be used to improve the quality of drug toxicity testing, DNA sensing and regenerative medicine.

=== Awards and honours ===
Her awards and honours include;

- 1995 University of Strathclyde William Marr Dux Award
- 1996 University of Strathclyde Dean's Honours Award
- 1996 University of Strathclyde Hackman Scholarship Research Award
- 1997 Sir George Beilby Memorial Medal
- 1999 Imperial Chemical Industries-Dupont Prize
- 2001 New Hall Junior Research Fellowship
- 2004 Exxon Mobil Teaching Fellowship
- 2008 Institute of Physics Polymer Physics Group and American Physical Society Division of Polymer Physics Young Researchers Award
- 2008 Royal Society of Chemistry Macro Group UK Young Researchers Medal
- 2014 Philip Leverhulme Prize for Engineering
- 2014 Finalist for the WISE Campaign Research Award

=== Personal life ===
Miller is married to Alberto Saiani, a materials scientist at the University of Manchester. They have three children.
