= Clusteroid =

Cell culturing method

A clusteroid is a method of producing 3D cell cultures that was first developed in 2019. Clusteroids are grown as not true spheroids but as dense clusters of cells in an aqueous two-phase system of water-in-water Pickering emulsion. The cells are incapsulated by mixing two aqueous solutions containing the incompatible polymers: Polyethylene oxide (PEO) solution as a continuous phase and dextran solution (DEX) as a dispersed phase, using whey protein as a stabiliser. Clusteoids as an in vitro model are more accurate to the complexities of in vivo, and aren't as susceptible to some of the problems 2D cultures present, for example; A large problem in culturing cells as a 2D monolayer is confluence as most cell lines used in research tend to decline in growth and health above 80% due to competition between cells for nutrients and oxygen in their growth media. A unique problem in non-vascularised clusteroids is necrotic core formation; as nutrients and oxygen cannot diffuse into the centre of the clusteroid without other cells taking it up, the cells within become starved and subsequently die. This necrotic core formation is similar to that of poorly-vascularised solid tumours.

Co-culture clusteroids are clusteroids that are composed of multiple different cell lines or types.

== Method of Creation ==
The DEX phase containing cells and the PEO phase containing whey protein particles is emulsified, encapsulating the cells in a DEX-PEO water-in-water emulsion template stabilized by whey protein particles. Additional PEO is then added to efflux the water from the DEX phase, causing osmotic shrinking of the cell-rich dextran droplets. The interfacial tension between the two phases packs the cells into tissue clusteroids. The emulsion is then broken by dilution with culture media and the gelling agent sodium alginate and a calcium chloride solution is then added to form a hydrogel. The clusteroids are then incubated in the gel for up to 7 days to form tissues or organoids. Finally the gel is reverted by into liquid form by alginate lyase.

== Use in Research ==
Co-culture clusteroids have been used in research into angiogenesis; vascularised clusteroids do not develop necrotic core formation as vessels created allow for perfusion of nutrients and oxygen into the centre of the clusteroid to occur, preventing cell death. Angiogenesis is initiated by pro-angiogenic growth factors such as vascular endothelial growth factor (VEGF), which is either exogenous or secreted by cells within the clusteroid, depending on the cells cultured. Clusteroids demonstrate tube and vessel formation in vitro. Use of Co-culture clusteroids as opposed to culturing separately leads to increased expression of angiogenesis-related genes demonstrating an impact of heterogeneity on cancer
