= MC2 Biotek =

- Industry: Biotechnology
- Founded: 2006
- Headquarters: Hørsholm, Denmark

MC2 Biotek is a biotechnology company established in 2006, with offices in Denmark and external labs in the United Kingdom. MC2 is a holding company, comprising three smaller Biotechnology companies with their own biotechnology solutions, they are: DrugMode (DK), Zadec (DK), and Drug Delivery Solutions (UK). DrugMode specializes in 3D cell culture, and is based out of the University of Southern Denmark at Odense. Zadec focuses on Diabetes and nutrition, and has developed an oral anti-diabetes drug, RX-1, which is currently in clinical trials. Drug Delivery Solutions works in the field of dermatology and ophthalmology, developing topical drugs such as a cream to treat psoriasis.

== Technology ==
Drug Delivery Solutions Limited, the Leatherhead daughter company of MC2 biotech, has developed a new method for drug formulation and delivery. This biliquid foam technology was patented as polyaphron dispersions (PAD) containing a complex internal phase, which are made as droplets of oil or multiphase liquid in an aqueous (or other hydrogen-bonding liquid) phase. Oil-soluble drug molecules can be dissolved within the oil phase, and drug delivery can be influenced by modifying the materials used in each phase. A 2008 PAD patent claims that this foam-like emulsion is stable with up to at least 70% dispersed oil phase and at most 3% surfactant. This PAD drug delivery system can allow for extended release drug delivery in enteral route of administration, or it can be formulated to be administered as a wound dressing. Manufacturing using this technology is simple and low cost compared to gastroretentive dosage forms (GRDF) in the prior art. MC2 Biotek's PAD technology has been applied commercially in dermatology and ophthalmology.

MC2 Biotek is collaborating with a group of South African researchers led by Dr. Johan Louw at the Medical Research Council (MRC) and Professor Lizette Joubert at the Agricultural Research Council (ARC) to research traditional rooibos and honeybush teas for their anti-diabetic and anti-obesity properties. One collaborative study showed that aqueous hot water honeybush extract when administered orally to type-2 diabetes rat models, promoted normoglycemia and improved other type-2 diabetes associated problems.

MC2 Biotek has also developed a 3D ProtoTissue™ Bioreactor, which allows cells from an immortal human hepatocyte line to grow into 3D spheroids. 3D tissue cultures in vitro have been shown to be much more representative of in vivo tissue than traditionally used 2D tissue cultures in vitro are. MC2 Biotek proposes that these 3D hepatocyte cultures be used in drug trials to evaluate toxicology and metabolism, because results would be more reflective of drug toxicology and metabolism in vivo than current 2D cell culture methods are.
