= Keith E. Mostov =

American cell biologist

Keith E. Mostov is an American cell biologist. He received a BA from University of Chicago in 1976 and during 1976–77 he was a Rhodes Scholar at New College, Oxford. Mostov received a PhD in Biological Science from the Rockefeller University in the laboratory of Nobel laureate Günter Blobel in 1983, and an MD from Weill Cornell Medicine in 1984. He was a Whitehead Fellow at the Whitehead Institute of MIT from 1984 to 1989. In 1989, Mostov joined the faculty of the University of California, San Francisco, School of Medicine, where he is currently Professor. Mostov and colleagues discovered and sequenced the Polymeric Immunoglobulin Receptor (pIgR) and proposed the generally accepted model of its pathway and function. Neil E. Simister and Mostov cloned and sequenced the Neonatal Fc Receptor (FcRn). Mostov and colleagues showed how signals in the pIgR direct its polarized trafficking and how polarized MDCK epithelial cells form three-dimensional structures with lumens and tubules. Mostov and colleagues further found how simple rules cause different branching patterns in kidney as compared to other branching tubular organs

== Honors and awards ==
- Rhodes Scholar
- Searle Scholar
- Charles E. Culpeper Foundation Medical Scholar
- Mallinckrodt Foundation Scholar
- NIH NIAID MERIT Award
- American Society for Cell Biology ASCB Fellow
