= 3D cell culture in wood-based nanocellulose hydrogel =

Hydrogel from wood-based nanofibrillated cellulose (NFC) is used as a matrix for 3D cell culture, providing a three-dimensional environment that more closely resembles the conditions found in living tissue. As plant based material, it does not contain any human- or animal-derived components. Nanocellulose is instead derived from wood pulp that has been processed to create extremely small, nanoscale fibers. These fibers can be used to create a hydrogel, which is a type of material that is made up of a network of cross-linked polymer chains and is able to hold large amounts of water.

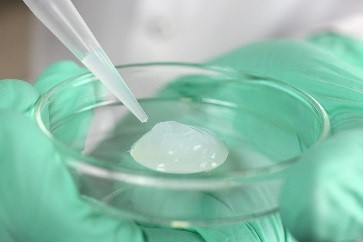
Nanofibrillar cellulose hydrogel

As the natural extracellular matrix (ECM) is important in the survival, proliferation, differentiation and migration of the cells, hydrogels mimicking natural ECM structure are considered as potential approaches towards in vivo –like cell culturing.

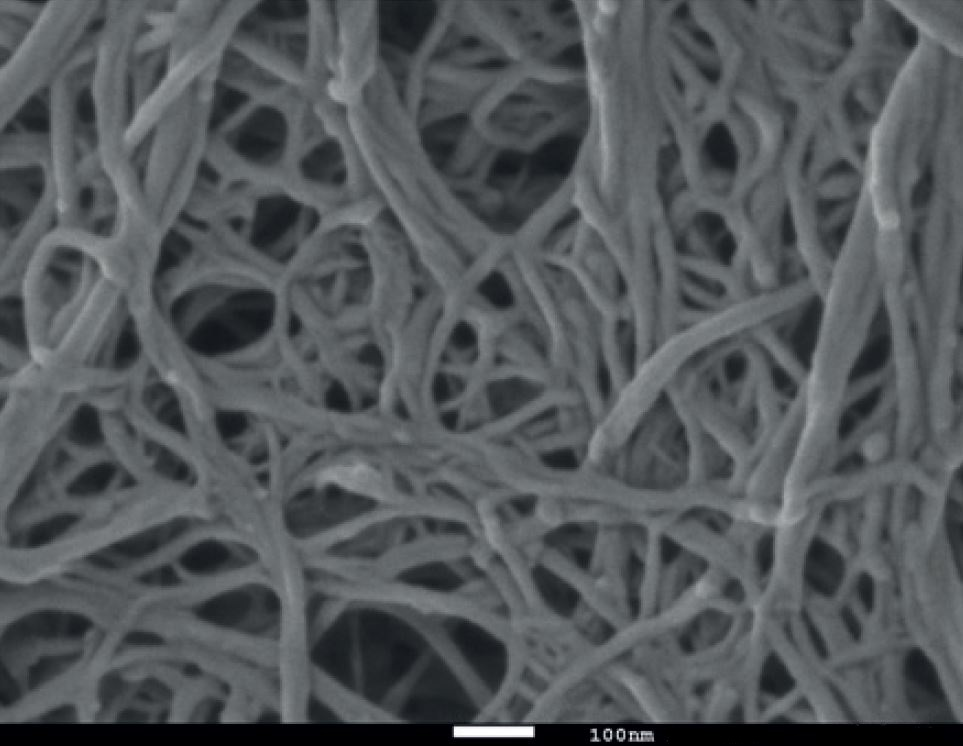
SEM image of NFC network

== Material properties ==
NFC fiber network structure and dimensions in hydrogel resemble human ECM. Stiffness can be tuned to optimize the conditions for each cell type. Shear-thinning property of the material makes the gel ready to use without cross-linking or gelification step. The nanocellulose hydrogel can be completely degraded by cellulase enzyme treatment while retaining the 3D cell structures.

== Applications ==
NFC hydrogel in 3D cell culture offers a platform for various biomedical applications. Different cell lines and cell types have been cultured in NFC, including e.g. differentiation of human hepatic cells to functional organotypic cultures, and proliferation of human pluripotent stem cells. Organotypic liver cell cultures can be used in drug discovery for testing liver toxicity and metabolism of the novel drug candidates. The possibility to use the hydrogel with robotic dispensers enables its use in high throughput screening (HTS) formats.

Additionally, 3D cell culture using wood-based nanocellulose hydrogel can be used for tissue engineering.

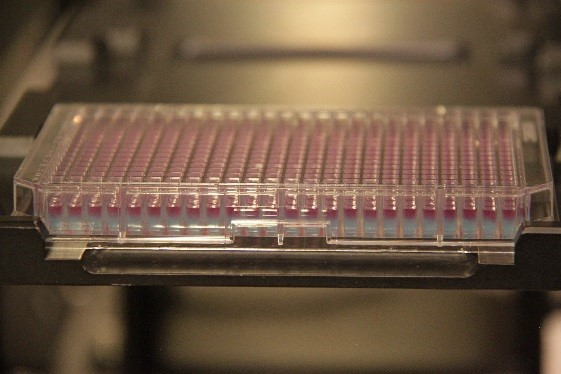
NFC hydrogel and cell culture medium in 384-well plate
