= Madin-Darby canine kidney cells =

Cell line

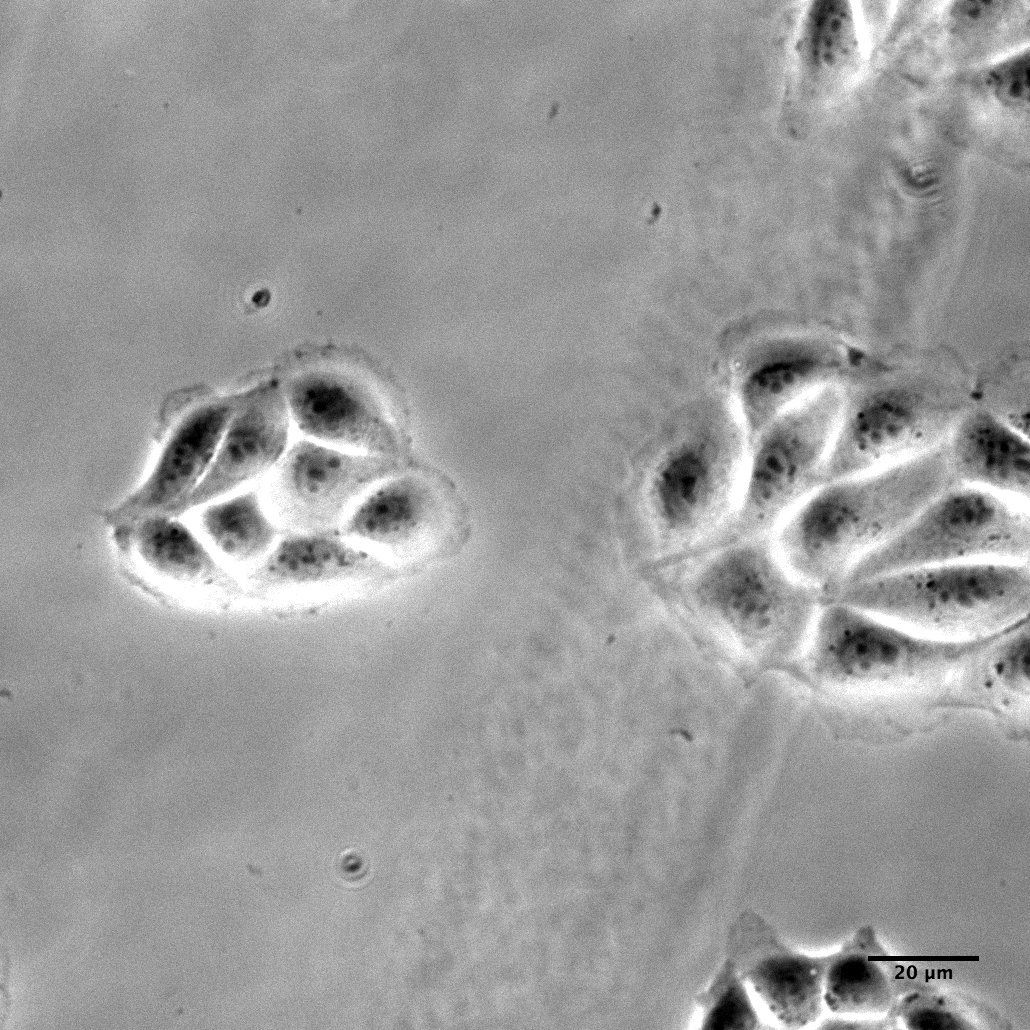
Typical colonies formed by Madin-Darby canine kidney cells when cultured in typical 2D format on plastic. Cells grow as tight colonies thanks to their cell-cell junctions, a hallmark of cells of epithelial origin.

Madin-Darby canine kidney (MDCK) cells are a model mammalian cell line used in biomedical research. MDCK cells are used for a wide variety of cell biology studies including cell polarity, cell-cell adhesions (termed adherens junctions), collective cell motility, toxicity studies, as well as responses to growth factors. It is one of few cell culture models that is suited for 3D cell culture and multicellular rearrangements known as branching morphogenesis.

== History ==
Following the initial isolation in 1958 of epithelial cells from the kidney tubule of an adult Cocker Spaniel dog by Stewart H. Madin and Norman B. Darby Jr., the cell line bearing their name was employed primarily as a model for viral infection of mammalian cells. Indeed, they chose to isolate kidney tubules with precisely this goal in mind, as they had previously succeeded with viral infection of cells derived from kidney tubules from other mammals. Thus the initial goal in isolating and culturing cells from this tissue was not to generate a new model system for epithelial cell biology. It was not until 1970 that the laboratory of Zbynek Brada published work describing MDCK cells as a representative cell line bearing hallmarks of kidney tubule epithelial cells. They based this conclusion on the fluid transport activities of monolayers formed of MDCK cells, the presence of microvilli on their apical (upper) surface, and their ability to self-organize, when grown in 3D, into hollow spheres. In their report, the authors speculated that the "histotypic expression" by which MDCK cells formed structures reminiscent of their tissue of origin might be fruitfully applied to the study of other tissues. The following decades have proved them largely right, although the repertoire for studying the organization and behavior of cells within tissues has vastly expanded.

Through the 1970s, the MDCK cell line found new use as a model for mammalian epithelial tissue. In 1982 Mina Bissell and colleagues showed that MDCK monolayers responded to the addition of a collagen overlay (dubbed a "sandwich culture") by proliferating and forming hollow tubules. This hinted for the first time that the cell line would respond to 3D environments by self-organizing into the appropriate 3D structure reminiscent of kidney tubules. In the following years, the culture of MDCK cells embedded fully in collagen was shown to yield hollow spheres, or acini. These were simple epithelial monolayers with a defined interior and exterior. However, the fact that MDCK cells did not form tubules under these conditions remained unexplained until later.

Over the same period in the 1980s, biologists studying cell motility had hit upon an interesting and reproducible behavior of cells in culture: the scattering response. Epithelial cells in culture grow normally as tight clusters. However, they could be induced to break cell-cell contacts and become elongated and motile after exposure to a "scatter factor" that was secreted by mesenchymal cells such as Swiss 3T3 fibroblasts. This was best described by Julia Gray's group in 1987. During the same period in the mid-1980s, a monoclonal antibody was reported by the group of Walter Birchmeier to disrupt cell-cell contacts and alter the front-rear polarity of cells in culture. The target of this antibody was later identified as a component of cell-cell junctions, E-cadherin. These disparate observations eventually coalesced into a resilient paradigm for cell motility and cell polarity. Epithelial cells are typically nonmotile, but can become motile by inhibiting cell-cell junctions or by addition of growth factors that induce scattering. Both of these are reversible, and both involve the rupture of cell-cell junctions.

In 1991, the response of MDCK acini in 3D culture to the scatter factor was first reported by Lelio Orci and colleagues. They cultured acini of MDCK cells in collagen gels with or without Swiss 3T3 fibroblasts, in which media could exchange but the cell types were not in direct contact. This cell culture strategy, termed coculture, induced MDCK acini to undergo branching morphogenesis, in which cells rearrange into a network of interconnected tubules that resembles the development of many tissues. In the same year, the "scatter factor" was shown to be a previously described protein secreted by fibroblasts, hepatocyte growth factor (HGF). This work solved an outstanding mystery of MDCK culture, as the tissue from which these cells were derived is tubular, yet they had previously only developed into spherical acini in 3D culture. Beyond that immediate paradox, a crucial connection was forged between the acute induction of cell motility in 2D culture by the "scatter factor", and its impact on the spatial organization adopted by tissues in 3D. This connection remains significant as a link between precisely defined mechanisms of cell motility in 2D and complex rearrangements in 3D whose regulation is yet to be understood fully.

== Branching morphogenesis ==
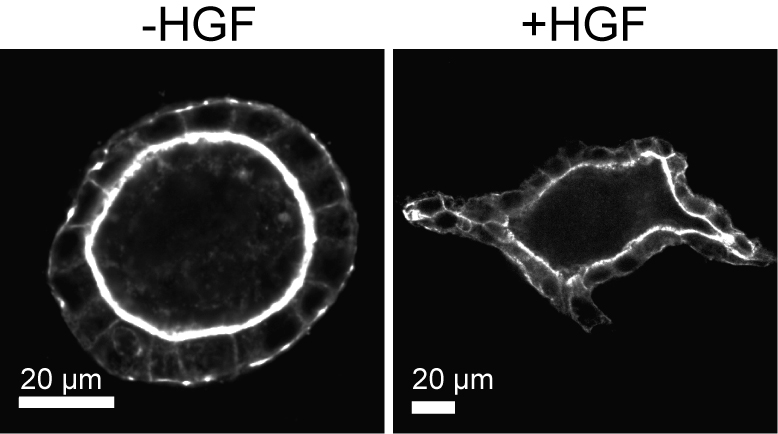
Branching morphogenesis over two days by Madin-Darby canine kidney cells in response to hepatocyte growth factor (HGF). Images were acquired by fluorescence confocal microscopy, showing the structural protein actin, which highlights cell borders. Left: multicellular hollow spheres of cells, termed acini, were grown in 3D culture. Right: after 2 days of treatment with HGF cells have formed multiple branches.

In the last 20 years, understanding of MDCK cell biology in 3D culture has been advanced most notably by the laboratory of Keith Mostov. This group has focused on the regulation of cell polarity and its downstream effects on branching morphogenesis. Indeed, the body of work generated by the Mostov group has successfully synthesized decades of knowledge about the spatial segregation of cellular functions, and their molecular markers, into a remarkable model for the generation and homeostasis of cellular polarity in tissues. In 2003 the Mostov group reported the first comprehensive account linking branching morphogenesis with hallmarks of apical-basal polarity. This work established that MDCK cells do not lose contacts with neighbors during the onset of branching morphogenesis, but that canonical markers of cell polarity are transiently lost. One outcome of this shift in polarity is the reorientation of cell division along a newly growing branch of cells, in order to correctly position daughter cells to continue branch extension. Cell motility by which MDCK cells produce and elongate branches was linked with these polarity changes.

These findings were integrated into a model for branching morphogenesis focused on the transient rearrangement of cell polarity signaling. This model has informally been referred to as the Mostov pathway. This allows normally nonmotile cells to generate protrusions and migrate collectively, followed by redifferentiation and formation of hollow tubules. In support of this model, Mostov and colleagues have identified the effects of HGF on MDCK acini as eliciting a partial transition from epithelial to mesenchymal cell phenotypes. This argument marshals an established signaling program termed the epithelial to mesenchymal transition (EMT), by which sessile epithelial cells become motile and break cell-cell contacts. EMT has been proposed as the transcriptional signaling cascade that drives cell scattering, although previously researchers did not conflate the two. Given the distinction that, for acini in 3D, cell-cell junctions do not rupture, it is unclear how to precisely relate the EMT concept with branching morphogenesis.

The Mostov group has also investigated the means by which HGF activates cell motility during MDCK branching morphogenesis. Their studies have shown that branching morphogenesis requires the Erk transcription factor, downstream of the mitogen activated protein kinase cascade, a well-defined signal transduction pathway implicated in cell motility and proliferation. The precise cell motility machinery responsible for MDCK branching morphogenesis has not been specified by the Mostov group, beyond the requirement for a signaling protein involved in regulating the small GTPase Rho. Moreover, the Gardel lab has shown that invasive motility of MDCK cells in acini requires Dia1, which regulates cell adhesions to individual collagen fibrils. Meanwhile, other groups have demonstrated the requirement for cell-ECM adhesion proteins or their regulators in MDCK branching morphogenesis. Using a modified protocol for MDCK cell culture and branching morphogenesis, Gierke and Wittman established the requirement for microtubule dynamics in regulating the early steps in branching. They observed deficient cell adhesive coupling to the collagen matrix when microtubules were deregulated. This phenotype indicated the importance of trafficking the appropriate cell adhesion and protrusion proteins to the cell front as branching morphogenesis was initiated. Combined with observations from the Mostov group, this work confirmed that cell polarity is indispensable for MDCK acinar homeostasis as well as migratory behaviors during branching morphogenesis.
