= B16 melanoma =

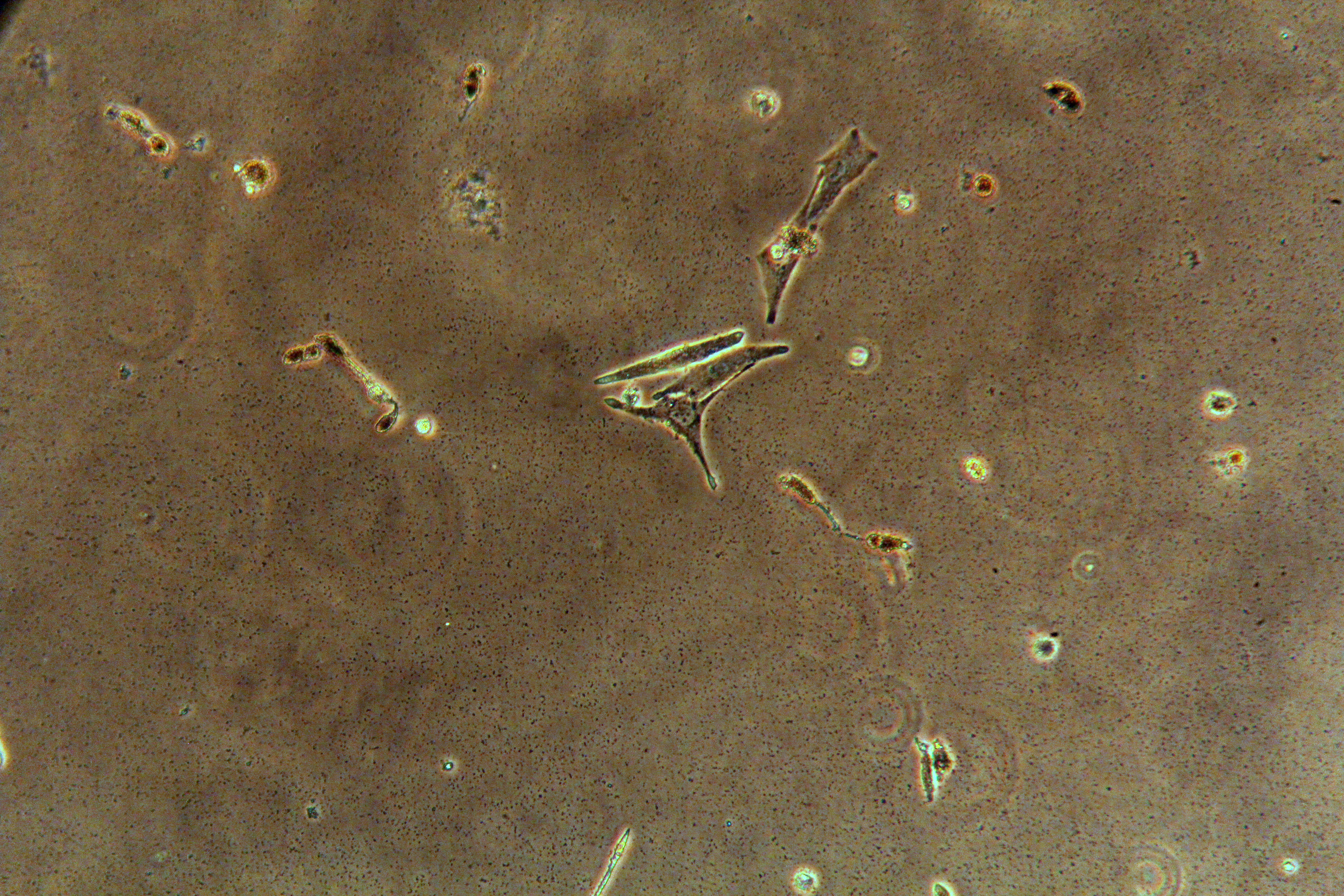
Mus musculus B16F10 skin melanoma cells in laboratory.

B16 melanoma is a murine tumor cell line used for research as a model for human skin cancers. B16 cells are useful models for the study of metastasis and solid tumor formation, and were one of the first effective murine tools for metastasis research. These cells readily metastasize to lymph nodes and lungs. The black melanin pigment they produce facilitates easy visualization of metastatic colonies in these organs.

== History ==
B16 cells were discovered and maintained in the Jackson Laboratories in Maine in 1954 when a tumor developed naturally behind the ear of a C57BL/6 mouse. The cells were resected, transplanted, and maintained in vivo, and still are today.

B16 models were in use to an extent in the 1970s, but it was Dr. Isaiah J. Fidler, a Jerusalem-born, Oklahoma State-trained veterinarian, and University of Pennsylvania-trained biological researcher, now at M.D. Anderson Cancer Center in Houston, Texas, who established solid protocols for use the B16 model. One of his first major studies involving B16 was in 1970. Dr. Fidler stained B16s, having cultured them in vitro, with 125I-5-iodo-2′-deoxyuridine for tracking, and implanted the cells into C57BL/6J mice, the common host, sacrificed the mice at different times, and measured the cells in the blood and in different organs. He ascertained that 99% of the original cell population had perished within a day, and that a cohort of about 400 cells had colonized the lung. The study was seminal because it established the existence of a reliable metastasis pathway that was uncomplicated to perturb and view changes. It also showed that metastasis is not guaranteed simply by the presence of tumor cells. Only a certain few are able to circulate and latch on to the right organ and begin to form a tumor.

In the 1980s it was discovered that B16 cells express very low levels of mouse class I major histocompatibility complex glycoproteins, H-2Kb and H-2Db, and that in vitro treatment with gamma interferon simultaneously induced a high expression of H-2 and an increase in the metastatic potential of B16 cells.

== Characteristics ==
B16 cells originate in melanin-producing epithelia of mice, and are easy to track in vivo post-transplantation. Their fidelity of metastasis from skin to lung, liver, and spleen makes them useful and predictable tools to study metastatic pathways.

In the 1962 edition of the Handbook of Genetically Standardized Jax Mice, the cells were described thus:

Gross: soft gray tissue, frequently hemorrhagic. Microscopic: tumor cells polyhedral or spindle-shaped, arranged in perivascular mantles and diffuse masses; some cells contain fine pigmented granules, a few are obscured by large, very dark globules of pigment; stoma delicate and vascular. Pigment greatly decreased in comparison with early transplant generation.

Varying surface proteins were shown to play an important part in the locative destiny of the cells on which they are affixed. The presence of high numbers of particular proteins correspond to a cell's affinity for particular organs was selected for in many of the lines perpetuated in labs in the seventies and eighties. Tumor cells from lungs, for instance, would be harvested from a deceased mouse and transplanted into another mouse's skin, and that mouse, upon death, would have its resultant lung tumors transplanted to the next mouse, and so on. Over time, cells in that line injected into the skin would almost always become lung tumors. The same directed etiology, moreover, has been undertaken for many other organs, leading to separate sub-lines with titles such as B16-F10, B16-BL6, B164A5, B16GMCSF, and B16FLT3.

== Use in Research ==
Today, B16 melanoma remains indispensable for metastasis studies. Current research projects focus on the cells' immunological response to vaccines, microRNA mediated metastatic properties, especially miR-21, a noted aggressor of tumor suppressors and anti-proliferative factors. B16 is also used as a pre-clinical model to study immunotherapy. Those are just a few examples, but the undergirding idea is that the B16 melanoma model is a powerful research tool, and a staple for metastasis studies, and its development as such can be considered a huge benefit to the cancer research community.
