= DLGAP5 =

Protein-coding gene in the species Homo sapiens

Identifiers
- Aliases: DLGAP5, DLG7, HURP, discs large homolog associated protein 5, DLG associated protein 5
- External IDs: OMIM: 617859; MGI: 2183453; HomoloGene: 8840; GeneCards: DLGAP5; OMA:DLGAP5 - orthologs

Gene location (Human)
| Chr. | Chromosome 14 (human) |
| Band | 14q22.3 | Start | 55,148,112 bp |
| Band | 14q22.3 | End | 55,191,608 bp |

Gene location (Mouse)
| Chr. | Chromosome 14 (mouse) |
| Band | 14 C1|14 24.6 cM | Start | 47,625,236 bp |
| Band | 14 C1|14 24.6 cM | End | 47,655,864 bp |
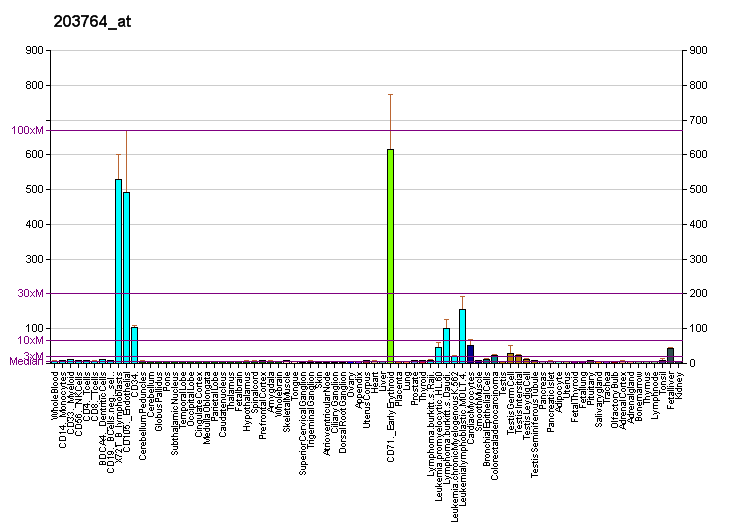
RNA expression pattern
| Bgee | Human / Mouse (ortholog); Top expressed in: secondary oocyte; ventricular zone; gonad; embryo; ganglionic eminence; trabecular bone; testicle; bone marrow; bone marrow cell; sperm / Top expressed in: tail of embryo; zygote; genital tubercle; primary oocyte; yolk sac; secondary oocyte; ventricular zone; blastocyst; epiblast; fetal liver hematopoietic progenitor cell; More reference expression data |
| BioGPS | More reference expression data |
Gene ontology
| Molecular function | protein binding; phosphoprotein phosphatase activity |
| Cellular component | microtubule organizing center; nucleus; cytoskeleton; spindle; spindle pole centrosome; cytoplasm; mitochondrion; cytosol |
| Biological process | positive regulation of mitotic metaphase/anaphase transition; cell cycle; mitotic chromosome movement towards spindle pole; cell population proliferation; signaling; protein dephosphorylation; positive regulation of transcription of Notch receptor target |
Sources:Amigo / QuickGO
Orthologs
| Species | Human | Mouse |
| Entrez | 9787 | 218977 |
| Ensembl | ENSG00000126787 | ENSMUSG00000037544 |
| UniProt | Q15398 | Q8K4R9 |
| RefSeq (mRNA) | NM_001146015; NM_014750 | NM_001145949; NM_144553 |
| RefSeq (protein) | NP_001139487; NP_055565 | NP_653136 |
| Location (UCSC) | Chr 14: 55.15 – 55.19 Mb | Chr 14: 47.63 – 47.66 Mb |
| PubMed search |
- Wikidata
| View/Edit Human | View/Edit Mouse |

Disks large-associated protein 5 (DAP-5) also known as discs large homolog 7 (DLG7) or hepatoma up-regulated protein (HURP) is a protein that in humans is encoded by the DLGAP5 gene.

DLG7 is a kinetochore protein that stabilizes microtubules in vicinity of chromosomes. DLG7 controls spindle dynamics, promotes interkinetochore tension and efficient kinetochore capture. DGL7 is a part of Ran-dependent complex. Stabilization of DGL7 in cell occurs due to phosphorylation by Aurora A kinase. Expression of DGL7 is found in cancer and stem cells.
