= BEnd.3 =

Mouse brain-cell line

bEnd.3 is a mouse brain cell line derived from BALB/c mice. The cell line is commonly used in vascular research and studies of endothelial brain tissue. In particular, bEnd.3 cells can serve as blood–brain barrier models for ischemia.
