= Multicellular tumor spheroids =

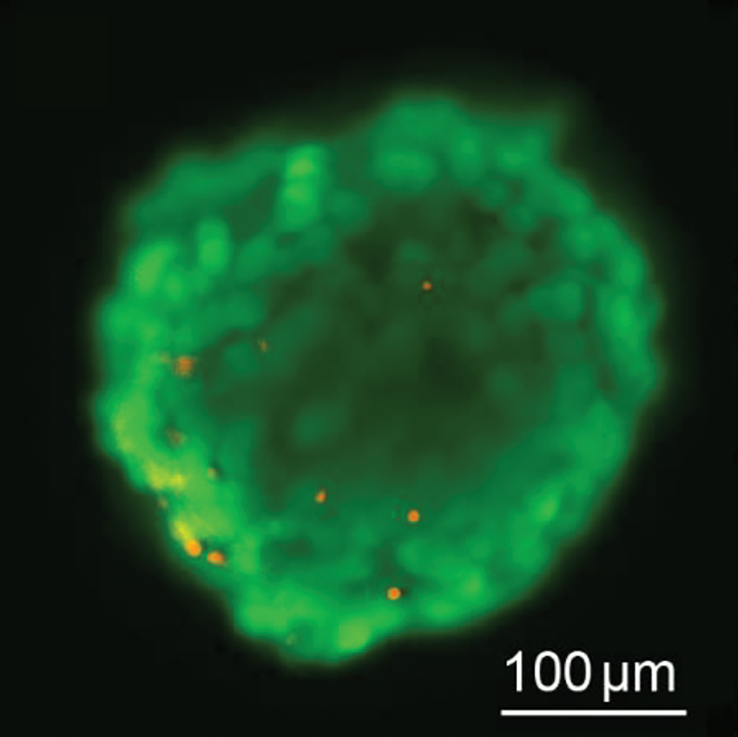
Viability assay of day 20 T47D spheroid.

Multicellular tumor spheroids (MCTS) are three-dimensional (3D)‌ aggregates of cells that serve as‌ widely used in-vitro models of tumors․ Unlike conventional two-dimensional (2D) cell cultures‚‌ MCTS enable cell-cell and cell-microenvironment interactions in 3D‚ and provide gradients of oxygen‚ nutrients‚ metabolites‚ and signaling molecules‚ as‌ well as microenvironments similar to in-vivo tumors.

The structure of MCTS is analogous to‌ that of solid tumors with an outer layer of‌ proliferating growth‚ a middle layer of quiescent cells‚ and a necrotic core in larger spheroids. Cells in the outer proliferating layer are better supplied with oxygen and‌ nutrients than the quiescent cells and can more quickly‌ expel waste to the environment surrounding the spheroids‚ and are therefore capable of dividing more rapidly․ The cells in the quiescent layer live in‌ hypoxic and nutrient-limited conditions‚ and are in a non-proliferative or low-proliferative state‚ while the cells‌ in the necrotic core are severely hypoxic and are undergoing cell death (necrosis)․ This is due to limited diffusion of oxygen and nutrients‚ with a necrotic core‌ developing in spheroids with larger diameters. These traits make MCTS a useful model for tumor biology and response to therapy․

== Preparation ==
MCTS are created using culture methods that prevent cells from adhering to flat surfaces‚ allowing cells to aggregate to form three-dimensional structures that more closely resemble the architecture and microenvironment found in solid living tumors․ The aggregation of cells through the cellular interactions of cell adhesion molecules (CAMs) leads to the formation of spheroids that compact into multicellular aggregates suspended in culture.

Various experimental methods‚ such as the hanging drop method‚ spinner culture‚ pellet culture‚ and shaker based suspension culture systems‚ have been used for the production of MCTS․ These methods allow for spheroid formation of controlled size and reproducibility for research purposes.

== Applications ==
MCTS are also commonly used to model the drug resistance of tumors: their internal structure means that drugs can be considerably less effective in spheroids than when used in monolayers‚ since the drugs must diffuse through multiple layers of cells.

Cancer treatment failure may also be due to the presence of a quiescent cell layer: since many chemotherapeutic agents are geared towards killing rapidly dividing cells‚ the proliferating outer layer of a MCTS may be killed‚ leaving the quiescent inner region and necrotic core relatively unaffected․ As such‚ MCTS may provide a more physiologically relevant model of drug response than 2D culture systems.

== Characterization ==
Imaging‚ molecular‚ and mechanical studies have characterized MCTS‚ providing insights on their architecture‚ cellular physiology‚ and physical properties.

=== Imaging techniques ===
Fluorescence imaging is one of the most used methods to visualize crystalline cellular architecture and MCTS biological activity․ Fluorescent dyes and proteins can visualize proliferation‚ apoptosis‚ and hypoxia in MCTS․ Confocal microscopy is often used in conjunction with fluorescence imaging as it provides optical sectioning and 3D reconstruction of spheroids to visualize the internal cellular architecture.

=== Molecular techniques ===
Gene expression analysis can be performed in MCTS using quantitative polymerase chain reaction (qPCR) and RNA sequencing to study changes in gene expression when growing cancer cells in three-dimensional structures in comparison to two-dimensional cultures. QPCR-based methods are useful to quantify the expression of individual genes involved in tumor growth‚ metabolism and hypoxia. In contrast, RNA sequencing is better utilized to analyze thousands of genes at once.

=== Mechanical characterization ===
The mechanical characterization of tumor spheroids is important for understanding how their material properties influence cancer progression, including invasion, metastasis, and treatment response. Tumor spheroids exhibit complex viscoelastic behavior arising from cell–cell adhesion, cytoskeletal contractility, and extracellular interactions. These mechanical properties play a key role in collective cell migration, tissue shape remodeling, and mechanotransduction. To quantify the mechanical properties of spheroids, researchers commonly employ bulk mechanical assays, including micropipette aspiration and compression testing. Micropipette aspiration applies a controlled pressure to induce deformation as the spheroid is aspirated into a pipette, allowing measurement of surface tension, viscosity, and elastic modulus through time-dependent creep response. Compression-based methods, including parallel-plate compression and microtweezer-based assays, measure force–indentation relationships to estimate stiffness and distinguish between solid-like and liquid-like mechanical behavior.
