= Magnetic 3D bioprinting =

Magnetic 3D bioprinting is a process that utilizes biocompatible magnetic nanoparticles to print cells into 3D structures or 3D cell cultures. In this process, cells are tagged with magnetic nanoparticles, thus making them magnetic. Once magnetic, these cells can be rapidly printed into specific 3D patterns using external magnetic forces that mimic tissue structure and function.

== General principle ==
Magnetic 3D bioprinting is an alternative to other 3D printing methods such as extrusion, photolithography, and stereolithography. Benefits of the technique include its rapid process (15 minutes – 1 hour), compared to the often days-long processes of others, the capacity for endogenous synthesis of extracellular matrix (ECM) without the need for an artificial protein substrate and fine spatial control, and the capacity for 3D cell culture models to be printed from simple spheroids and rings into more complex organotypic models such as the lung, aortic valve, and white fat.

== Process ==
=== Using magnetic nanoparticles ===
The cells first need to be incubated in the presence of magnetic nanoparticles to make them susceptible to manipulation through magnetic fields. The system is a nanoparticle assembly consisting of gold, magnetic iron oxide, and poly-L-lysine which assists in adhesion to the cell membrane via electrostatic interactions. In this system, cells are printed into 3D patterns (rings or dots) using fields generated by permanent magnets. The cells within the printed construct interact with surrounding cells and the ECM to migrate, proliferate, and ultimately shrink the structure, typically within 24 hours.

When used as a toxicity assay, this shrinkage varies with drug concentration and is a label-free metric of cell function that can be captured and measured with brightfield imaging. The size of the pattern can be captured using an iPod-based system, which is programmed using an app (Experimental Assistant) to image whole plates of up to 96 structures at intervals as short as one second.

=== Using diamagnetism ===
Cells can be assembled without using magnetic nanoparticles by employing diamagnetism. Some materials are more strongly attracted, or susceptible, to magnets than others. Materials with greater magnetic susceptibility will experience stronger attraction to a magnet and move towards it. The more weakly attracted material with lower susceptibility is displaced to lower magnetic field regions that lie away from the magnet. By designing magnetic fields through careful arrangement of magnets, it is possible to use the differences in the magnetic susceptibilities of two materials to concentrate only one within a volume.

An example of usage of this technique is when bio-ink was formulated by suspending human breast cancer cells in a cell culture medium that contained the paramagnetic salt, diethylenetriaminepentaacetic acid gadolinium (III) dihydrogen salt hydrate (Gd-DTPA). Like most cells, these breast cancer cells are much more weakly attracted by magnets than Gd-DTPA, which is an FDA-approved MRI contrast agent for use in humans. Therefore, when a magnetic field was applied, the salt hydrate moved towards the magnets, displacing the cells to a predetermined area of minimum magnetic field strength, which seeded the formation of a 3D cell cluster.

== Applications ==
Magnetic 3D bioprinting can be used to screen for cardiovascular toxicity, which accounts for 30% of cardiac drug withdrawals. Vascular smooth muscle cells are magnetically printed into 3D rings to mimic blood vessels that can contract and dilate. This system could potentially replace experiments using ex vivo tissue, which are costly and yield little data per experiment. Furthermore, magnetic 3D bioprinting can use human cells to approximate a human in vivo response better than with an animal model. This has been demonstrated by the bioassay which combines the benefits of 3D bioprinting in building tissue-like structures for study with the speed of magnetic printing.

== See also ==
- Bio-printing
- Organovo
