= Cell culture assay =

Method used to assess the cytotoxicity of a material

A cell culture assay is any method used to assess the cytotoxicity of a material. This refers to the in vitro assessment of a material to determine whether it releases toxic chemicals in the cell. It also determines if the quantity is sufficient to kill cells, either directly or indirectly, through the inhibition of cell metabolic pathways. Cell culture evaluations are the precursor to whole animal studies and are a way to determine if significant cytotoxicity exists for the given material. Cell culture assays are standardized by ASTM, ISO, and BSI (British Standards Institution.)

== See also ==
- Microphysiometry
