= LLGL1 =

Protein-coding gene in the species Homo sapiens

Identifiers
- Aliases: LLGL1, DLG4, HUGL, HUGL-1, HUGL1, LLGL, Lgl1, Mgl1, scribble cell polarity complex component, LLGL scribble cell polarity complex component 1
- External IDs: OMIM: 600966; MGI: 102682; GeneCards: LLGL1

Gene location (Human)
Chr.	Chromosome 17 (human)
Band	17p11.2	Start	18,225,635 bp
Band	17p11.2	End	18,244,875 bp

Gene location (Mouse)
Chr.	Chromosome 11 (mouse)
Band	11 B2|11 37.81 cM	Start	60,590,549 bp
Band	11 B2|11 37.81 cM	End	60,605,012 bp
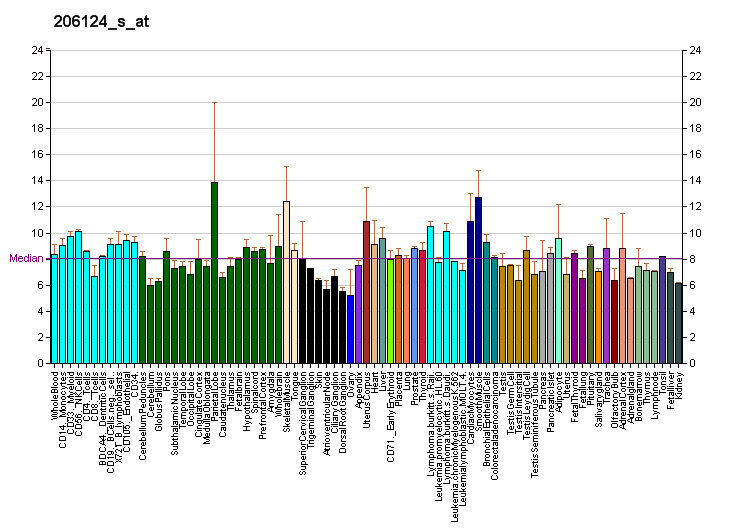

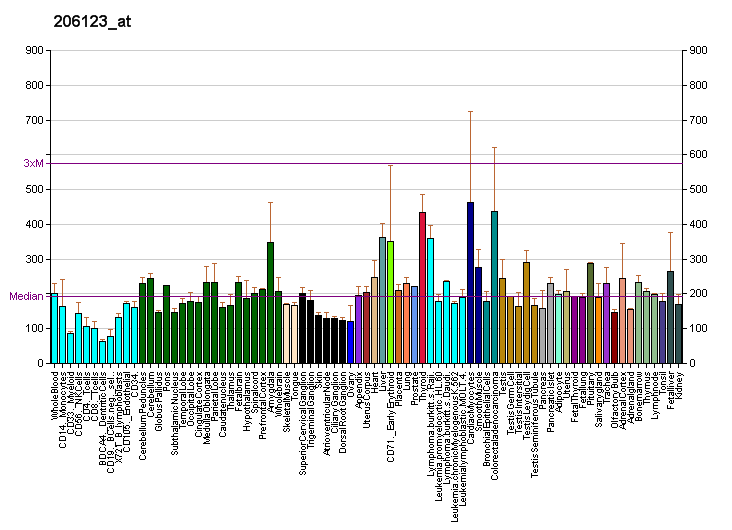
RNA expression pattern
Bgee	Human / Mouse (ortholog); Top expressed in: C1 segment; ventricular zone; ganglionic eminence; substantia nigra; hippocampus proper; temporal lobe; amygdala; putamen; stromal cell of endometrium; caudate nucleus / Top expressed in: medial ganglionic eminence; ventricular zone; Rostral migratory stream; CA3 field; primitive streak; entorhinal cortex; somite; perirhinal cortex; mandibular prominence; lactiferous gland; More reference expression data
BioGPS	More reference expression data
Gene ontology
Molecular function	GTPase activator activity; structural molecule activity; protein binding; syntaxin binding; protein kinase binding; myosin II binding
Cellular component	cytoplasm; endosome; Golgi apparatus; cell projection; trans-Golgi network membrane; early endosome membrane; membrane; Golgi membrane; plasma membrane; Golgi cis cisterna; axon; cortical actin cytoskeleton; cytoskeleton
Biological process	axonogenesis; regulation of exocytosis; Golgi to plasma membrane transport; cortical actin cytoskeleton organization; exocytosis; regulation of protein secretion; positive regulation of GTPase activity; protein-containing complex assembly; regulation of establishment or maintenance of cell polarity; establishment of spindle orientation; regulation of Notch signaling pathway
Sources:Amigo / QuickGO
Orthologs
Databases	NCBI: entry; OMA: entry
Species	Human	Mouse
Entrez	3996	16897
Ensembl	ENSG00000284137; ENSG00000131899	ENSMUSG00000020536
UniProt	Q15334	Q80Y17
RefSeq (mRNA)	NM_004140	NM_001159404; NM_001159405; NM_008502; NM_001378836; NM_001378837
RefSeq (protein)	NP_004131	NP_001152876; NP_001152877; NP_032528; NP_001365765; NP_001365766
Location (UCSC)	Chr 17: 18.23 – 18.24 Mb	Chr 11: 60.59 – 60.61 Mb
PubMed search
- Wikidata
View/Edit Human	View/Edit Mouse

Lethal(2) giant larvae protein homolog 1 is a protein that in humans is encoded by the LLGL1 gene.

This gene encodes a protein that is similar to a tumor suppressor in Drosophila. The protein is part of a cytoskeletal network and is associated with nonmuscle myosin II heavy chain and a kinase that specifically phosphorylates this protein at serine residues. The gene is located within the Smith-Magenis syndrome region on chromosome 17.
