= Microfluidic cell culture =

Microfluidic cell culture integrates knowledge from biology, biochemistry, engineering, and physics to develop devices and techniques for culturing, maintaining, analyzing, and experimenting with cells at the microscale. It merges microfluidics, a set of technologies used for the manipulation of small fluid volumes (μL, nL, pL) within artificially fabricated microsystems, and cell culture, which involves the maintenance and growth of cells in a controlled laboratory environment. Microfluidics has been used for cell biology studies as the dimensions of the microfluidic channels are well suited for the physical scale of cells (in the order of magnitude of 10 micrometers). For example, eukaryotic cells have linear dimensions between 10 and 100 μm which falls within the range of microfluidic dimensions. A key component of microfluidic cell culture is being able to mimic the cell microenvironment which includes soluble factors that regulate cell structure, function, behavior, and growth. Another important component for the devices is the ability to produce stable gradients that are present in vivo as these gradients play a significant role in understanding chemotactic, durotactic, and haptotactic effects on cells.

== Fabrication ==
Some considerations for microfluidic devices relating to cell culture include:

- fabrication material (e.g., polydimethylsiloxane (PDMS), polystyrene)
- culture region geometry
- control system for delivering and removing media when needed using either passive methods (e.g., gravity-driven flow, capillary pumps, or Laplace pressure based 'passive pumping') or a flow-rate controlled device (i.e., perfusion system)

Fabrication material is crucial as not all polymers are biocompatible, with some materials such as PDMS causing undesirable adsorption or absorption of small molecules. Additionally, uncured PDMS oligomers can leach into the cell culture media, which can harm the microenvironment. As an alternative to commonly used PDMS, there have been advances in the use of thermoplastics (e.g., polystyrene) as a replacement material.

Spatial organization of cells in microscale devices largely depends on the culture region geometry for cells to perform functions in vivo. For example, long, narrow channels may be desired to culture neurons. The perfusion system chosen might also affect the geometry chosen. For example, in a system that incorporates syringe pumps, channels for perfusion inlet, perfusion outlet, waste, and cell loading would need to be added for the cell culture maintenance. Perfusion in microfluidic cell culture is important to enable long culture periods on-chip and cell differentiation.

Other critical aspects for controlling the microenvironment include: cell seeding density, reduction of air bubbles as they can rupture cell membranes, evaporation of media due to an insufficiently humid environment, and cell culture maintenance (i.e. regular, timely media changes).

Cell's health is defined as the collective equilibrium activities of essential and specialized cellular processes; while a cell stressor is defined as a stimulus that causes excursion from its equilibrium state. Hence, cell health may be perturbed within microsystems based on platform design or operating conditions. Exposure to stressors within microsystems can impact cells through direct and indirect ways. Therefore, it is important to design the microfluidics system for cell culture in a manner that minimizes cell stress situations. For example, by minimizing cell suspension, by avoiding abrupt geometries (which tend to favor bubble formation), designing higher and wider channels (to avoid shear stress), or avoiding thermosensitive hydrogels.

== Advantages ==
Some of the major advantages of microfluidic cell culture include reduced sample volumes (especially important when using primary cells, which are often limited) and the flexibility to customize and study multiple microenvironments within the same device. A reduced cell population can also be used in a microscale system (e.g., a few hundred cells) in comparison to macroscale culture systems (which often require 10^{5} – 10^{7} cells); this can make studying certain cell-cell interactions more accessible. These reduced cell numbers make studying non-dividing or slow dividing cells (e.g., stem cells) easier than traditional culture methods (e.g., flasks, petri dishes, or well plates) due to the smaller sample volumes. Given the small dimensions in microfluidics, laminar flow can be achieved, allowing manipulations with the culture system to be done easily without affecting other culture chambers. Laminar flow is also useful as is it mimics in vivo fluid dynamics more accurately, often making microscale culture more relevant than traditional culture methods. Compartmentalized microfluidic cultures have also been combined with live cell calcium imaging, where depolarizing stimuli have been delivered to the peripheral terminals of neurons, and calcium responses recorded in the cell body. This technique has demonstrated a stark difference in the sensitivity of the peripheral terminals compared to the neuronal cell body to certain stimuli such as protons. This gives an excellent example as to why it is so important to study the peripheral terminals in isolation using microfluidic cell culture devices.

== Culture platforms ==
=== Traditional cell culture ===
Traditional two-dimensional (2D) cell culture is cell culture that takes place on a flat surface, e.g. the bottom of a well-plate, and is known as the conventional method. While these platforms are useful for growing and passaging cells to be used in subsequent experiments, they are not ideal environments to monitor cell responses to stimuli as cells cannot freely move or perform functions as observed in vivo that are dependent on cell-extracellular matrix material interactions. To address this issue many methods have been developed to create a three-dimensional (3D) native cell environment. One example of a 3D method is the hanging drop, where a droplet with growing cells is suspended and hangs downwards, which allows cells to grow around and atop of one another, forming a spheroid. The hanging drop method has been used to culture tumor cells but is limited to the geometry of a sphere. Since the advent of poly(dimethylsiloxane) (PDMS) microfluidic device fabrication through soft lithography microfluidic devices have progressed and have proven to be very beneficial for mimicking a natural 3D environment for cell culture.

=== Microfluidic cell culture ===
Microfluidic devices make possible the study of a single cell to a few hundred cells in a 3D environment. Comparatively, macroscopic 2D cultures have 10^{4} to 10^{7} cells on a flat surface. Microfluidics also allow for chemical gradients, the continuous flow of fresh media, high through put testing, and direct output to analytical instruments. Additionally, open microfluidic cell cultures such as "microcanals" allow for direct physical manipulation of cells with micropipettes. Many microfluidic systems employ the use of hydrogels as the extracellular matrix (ECM) support which can be modulated for fiber thickness and pore size and have been demonstrated to allow the growth of cancer cells. Gel free 3D cell cultures have been developed to allow cells to grow in either a cell dense environment or an ECM poor environment. Although these devices have proven very useful, there are certain disadvantages such as cells sticking to the PDMS surface, small molecules diffusing into the PDMS, and unreacted PDMS polymers washing into cell culture media.

The use of 3D cell cultures in microfluidic devices has led to a field of study called organ-on-a-chip. The first report of these types of microfluidic cultures was used to study the toxicity of naphthalene metabolites on the liver and lung (Viravaidya et al.). These devices can grow a stripped-down version of an organ-like system that can be used to understand many biological processes. By adding an additional dimension, more advanced cell architectures can be achieved, and cell behavior is more representative of in vivo dynamics; cells can engage in enhanced communication with neighboring cells and cell-extracellular matrix interactions can be modeled. In these devices, chambers or collagen layers containing different cell types can interact with one another for multiple days while various channels deliver nutrients to the cells. An advantage of these devices is that tissue function can be characterized and observed under controlled conditions (e.g., effect of shear stress on cells, effect of cyclic strain or other forces) to better understand the overall function of the organ. While these 3D models offer better model organ function on a cellular level compared with 2D models, there are still challenges. Some of the challenges include: imaging of the cells, control of gradients in static models (i.e., without a perfusion system), and difficulty recreating vasculature. Despite these challenges, 3D models are still used as tools for studying and testing drug responses in pharmacological studies. In recent years, there are microfluidic devices reproducing the complex in vivo microvascular network. Organs-on-a-chip have also been used to replicate very complex systems like lung epithelial cells in an exposed airway and provides valuable insight for how multicellular systems and tissues function in vivo. These devices are able to create a physiologically realistic 3D environment, which is desirable as a tool for drug screening, drug delivery, cell-cell interactions, tumor metastasis etc. In one study, researchers grew tumor cells and tested the drug delivery of cis platin, resveratrol, tirapazamine (TPZ) and then measured the effects the drugs have on cell viability.

== Applications of cells in microfluidic systems ==
Microfluidic systems can be used to culture several cell types.

=== Culture of mammalian cells ===
Mammalian cell cultures can be seeded, grown for several weeks, detached, and passaged to a fresh culture medium ad nauseam by digital microfluidic (DMF) devices on a macro-scale.

=== Culture of non-mammalian cells ===
==== Algae ====
Algae can be incubated, and their growth rate and lipid production can be monitored in a hanging-drop microfluidic system. For example, Mishra et al. developed a 25 × 75 mm, easily accessible microfluidic device. This design is used to optimize the conditions by changing well diameters, UV light exposure (causing mutagenesis), and light/no light tests for culturing Botryococcus braunii, which is one of the most common freshwater microalgae for biofuel production.

==== Bacteria and yeast ====
Microfluidic systems can be used to incubate high volumes of bacteria and yeast colonies. The two-layer microchemostat device is made to allow scientists to culture cells under chemostatic and thermostatic conditions without moving cells around and causing intercellular interaction. Yeast cell suspension droplets can be placed on a plate with patterned hydrophilic areas and incubated for 24 hours; then the droplets are split the produced proteins from yeast are analyzed by MALDI-MS without killing the cells in the original droplets.

== Multi-culture in microfluidics ==
Compared to the highly complex microenvironment in vivo, traditional mono-culture of single cell types in vitro only provides limited information about cellular behavior due to the lack of interactions with other cell types. Typically, cell-to-cell signaling can be divided into four categories depending on the distance: endocrine signaling, paracrine signaling, autocrine signaling, and juxtacrine signaling. For example, in paracrine signaling, growth factors secreted from one cell diffuse over a short distance to the neighboring target cell, whereas in juxtacrine signaling, membrane-bound ligands of one cell directly bind to surface receptors of adjacent cells. There are three conventional approaches to incorporate cell signaling in in vitro cell culture: conditioned media transfer, mixed (or direct) co-culture, and segregated (or indirect) co-culture. The use of conditioned media, where the cultured medium of one cell type (the effector) is introduced to the culture of another cell type (the responder), is a traditional way to include the effects of soluble factors in cell signaling. However, this method only allows one-way signaling, does not apply to short-lived factors (which often degrade before transfer to the responder cell culture), and does not allow temporal observations of the secreted factors. Recently, co-culture has become the predominant approach to study the effect of cellular communication by culturing two biologically related cell types together. Mixed co-culture is the simplest co-culture method, where two types of cells are in direct contact within a single culture compartment at the desired cell ratio. Cells can communicate by paracrine and juxtacrine signaling, but separated treatments and downstream analysis of a single cell type are not readily feasible due to the completely mixed population of cells. The more common method is segregated co-culture, where the two cell types are physically separated but can communicate in shared media by paracrine signaling. The physical barrier can be a porous membrane, a solid wall, or a hydrogel divider. If the physical barrier is removable (such as in PDMS or hydrogel), the assay can also be used to study cell invasion or cell migration. Co-culture designs can be adapted to tri- or multi-culture, which are often more representative of in vivo conditions relative to co-culture.

=== Closed channel multi-culture systems ===
The flexibility of microfluidic devices greatly contributes to the development of multi-culture studies by improved control over spatial patterns. Closed channel systems made by PDMS are most commonly used because PDMS has traditionally enabled rapid prototyping. For example, mixed co-culture can be achieved in droplet-based microfluidics easily by a co-encapsulation system to study paracrine and juxtacrine signaling. Two types of cells are co-encapsulated in droplets by combining two streams of cell-laden agarose solutions. After gelation, the agarose microgels will serve as a 3D microenvironment for cell co-culture. Segregated co-culture is also realized in microfluidic channels to study paracrine signaling. Human alveolar epithelial cells and microvascular endothelial cells can be co-cultured in compartmentalized PDMS channels, separated by a thin, porous, and stretchable PDMS membrane to mimic alveolar-capillary barrier. Endothelial cells can also be co-cultured with cancer cells in a monolayer while separated by a 3D collagen scaffold to study endothelial cell migration and capillary growth. When embedded in gels, salivary gland adenoid cystic carcinoma (ACC) cells can be co-cultured with carcinoma-associated fibroblast (CAF) in a 3D extracellular matrix to study stroma-regulated cancer invasion in the 3D environment. If juxtacrine signaling is to be investigated solely without paracrine signaling, a single cell coupling co-culture microfluidic array can be designed based on a cellular valving principle.

=== Open channel multi-culture systems ===
Although closed channel microfluidics (discussed in the section above) offers high customizability and biological complexity for multi-culture, the operation often requires handling expertise and specialized equipment, such as pumps and valves. In addition, the use of PDMS is known to cause adverse effects to cell culture, including leaching of oligomers or absorption of small molecules, thus often doubted by biologists. Therefore, open microfluidic devices made of polystyrene (PS), a well-established cell culture material, started to emerge. The advantages of open multi-culture designs are direct pipette accessibility and easy fabrication (micro-milling, 3D printing, injection molding, or razor-printing – without the need for a subsequent bonding step or channel clearance techniques). They can also be incorporated into traditional cultureware (well plate or petri dish) while remaining the complexity for multi-culture experiments. For example, the "monorail device" which patterns hydrogel walls along a rail via spontaneous capillary flow can be inserted into commercially available 24-well plates. Flexible patterning geometries are achieved by merely changing 3D printed or milled inserts. The monorail device can also be adapted to study multikingdom soluble factor signaling, which is difficult in traditional shared media co-culture due to the different media and culture requirements for microbial and mammalian cells. Another open multi-culture device fabricated by razor-printing is capable of integrating numerous culture modalities, including 2D, 3D, Transwell, and spheroid culture. It also shows improved diffusion to promote soluble factor paracrine signaling.

== Controlling cell microenvironment ==
Microfluidic systems expand their ability to control the local cell microenvironment beyond what is possible with conventional culture systems. Being able to provide different environments in a steady, sustainable and precise manner has a significant impact on cell culture research and study. Those environmental factors include physical (shear stress), biochemical (cell-cell interactions, cell-molecule interactions, cell-substrate interactions), and physicochemical (pH, CO_{2}, temperature, O_{2}) factors.

=== Oxygen concentration control ===
Oxygen plays an essential role in biological systems. Oxygen concentration control is one of the key elements when designing the microfluidic systems, whether the aerobic species or when modulating cellular functions in vivo, such as baseline metabolism and function. Multiple microfluidic systems have been designed to control the desired gas concentrations for cell culture. For example, generating oxygen gradients was achieved by single-thin-layer PDMS construction within channels (thicknesses less than 50 μm, diffusion coefficient of oxygen in native PDMS at 25 °C, D= 3.55 × 10^{−5} cm^{2} s^{−1}) without using gas cylinders or oxygen scavenging agents; thus the microfluidic cell culture device can be placed in incubators and be operated easily. However, the PDMS may be problematic for the adsorption of small hydrophobic species. Poly(methyl pentene) (PMP) may be an alternative material, because it has high oxygen permeability and biocompatibility like PDMS. In addition to the challenges of controlling gas concentration, monitoring oxygen in the microfluidic system is another challenge to address. There are numerous different dye indicators that can be used as optical, luminescence-based oxygen sensing, which is based on the phenomenon of luminescence quenching by oxygen, without consuming oxygen in the system. This technique makes monitoring oxygen in microscale environments feasible and can be applied in biological laboratories.

=== Temperature control ===
Temperature can be sensed by cells and influences their behavior, such as biochemical reaction kinetics. However, it is hard to control high-resolution temperature in traditional cell culture systems; whereas, microfluidic systems are proven to successfully reach the desired temperature under different temperature conditions through several techniques. For example, the temperature gradient in the microfluidic system can be achieved by mixing two or more inputs at different temperatures and flow rates, and the temperature is measured in the outlet channels by embedding polymer-based aquarium thermocouples. Also, by installing heaters and digital temperature sensors at the base of the microfluidic system, it has been demonstrated that a microfluidic cell culture system can continuously operate for at least 500 hours. The circulating water channels in the microfluidic system are also used to precisely control temperatures of the cell culture channels and chambers. Furthermore, putting the device inside a cell culture incubator can also easily control the cell culture temperature.

== See also ==
- Microphysiometry
