= Paper-based biosensor =

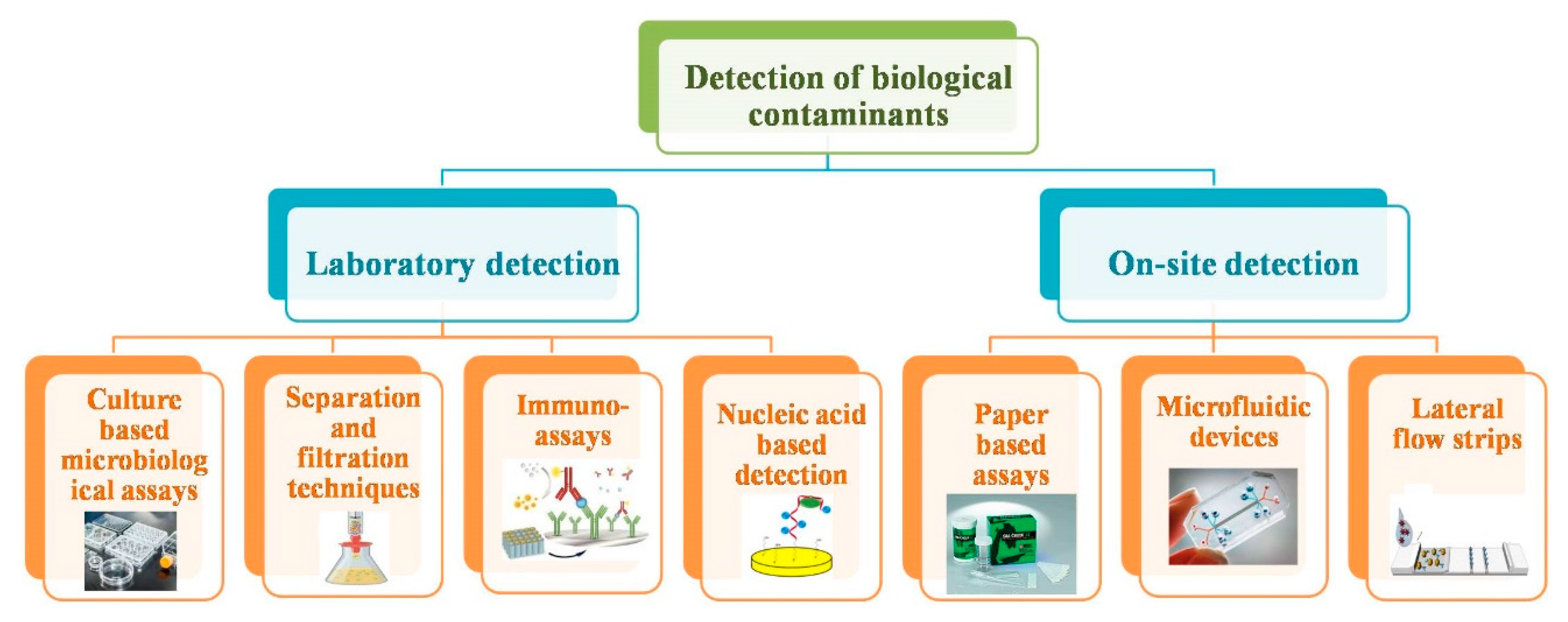
Schematic illustrating various methods of measuring contamination in samples

Paper-based biosensors are a subset of paper-based microfluidics used to detect the presence of pathogens in water. Paper-based detection devices have been touted for their low cost, portability and ease of use. Its portability in particular makes it a good candidate for point-of-care testing. However, there are also limitations to these assays, and scientists are continually working to improve accuracy, sensitivity, and ability to test for multiple contaminants at the same time.

== History ==
Paper has been used in analytical chemistry as far back as the 1800s, when litmus paper was first reported, and has since been used for techniques such as paper chromatography and lateral flow assays. However, it was only identified as a material for microfluidic assays in 2007, when patterned paper was proposed as a low-cost platform for bioassays.

== Varieties of paper-based biosensors ==
A number of paper-based biosensors have been developed, which use a variety of approaches. In general, pathogens are detected via colorimetric, electrochemical, fluorescent, and chemiluminescent detection, though there are other types of sensors as well. Several examples of paper-based biosensors are described below.

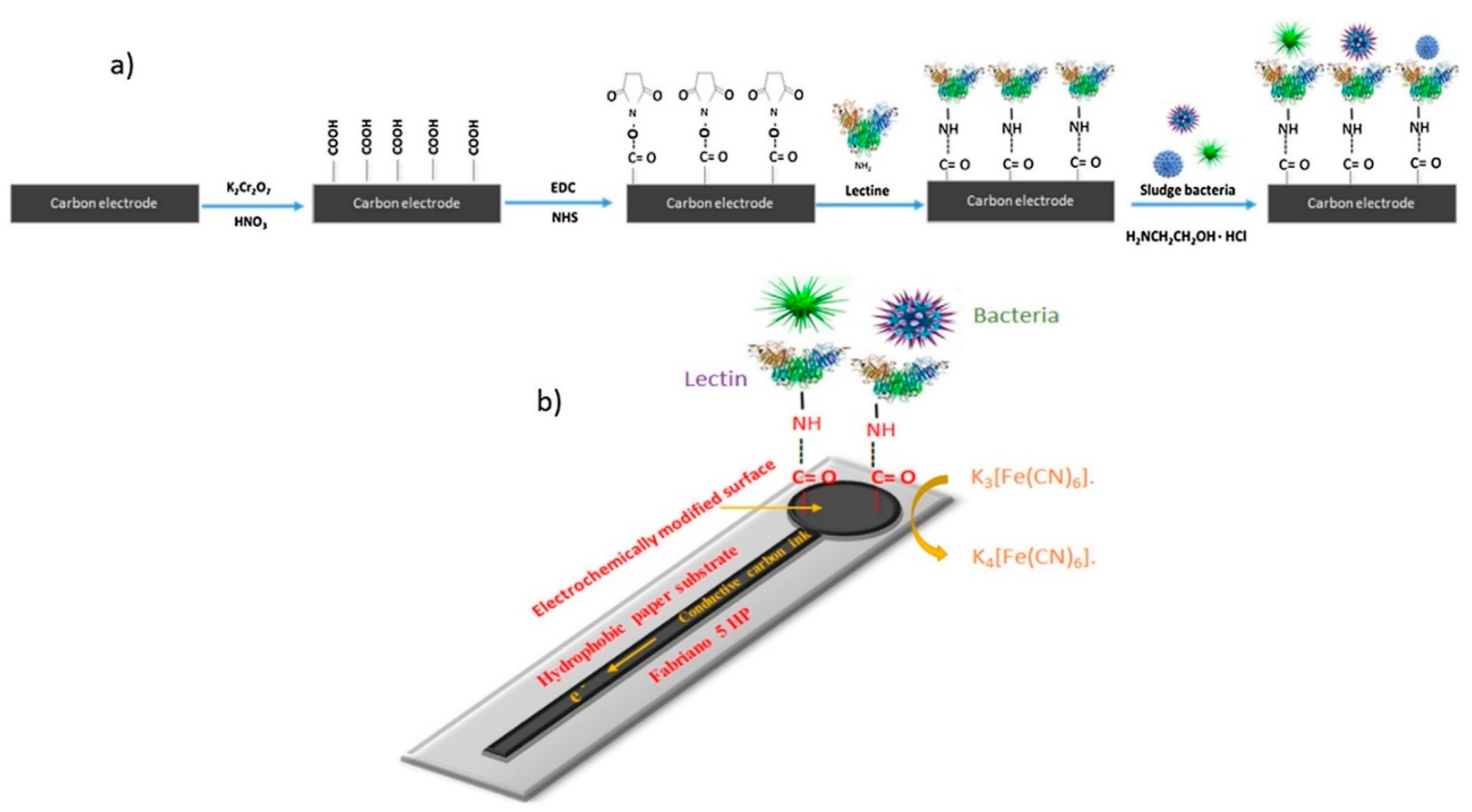
Schematic representation of an electrochemical, paper-based biosensor which is capable of detecting bacteria in water samples

=== For general bacterial detection ===
One device that has been described as being capable of detecting bacterial presence in water samples uses the common property of oligosaccharides and monosaccharides present on the surface of bacterial cells. It is an electrochemical device which uses hydrophobic paper that has been imbedded with carbon electrodes. Instead of using antibodies as the detectors, which are expensive, this device uses Concanavalin A (Con A), which is highly specific to the oligosaccharides and monosaccharides. The Con A is attached to the carbon electrodes, which are also equipped with carboxyl groups. The presence of bacteria triggers a series of electrochemical reactions, which are measured using a device called a potentiostat. This device is less sensitive than some others, with a detection limit of 1.9 × 10^{3} CFU/mL. By comparison, some ELISAs range from 20 CFU/mL to 1 × 10^{4} CFU/mL.

=== For detecting E. coli ===
==== Detection via bacteriophage ====
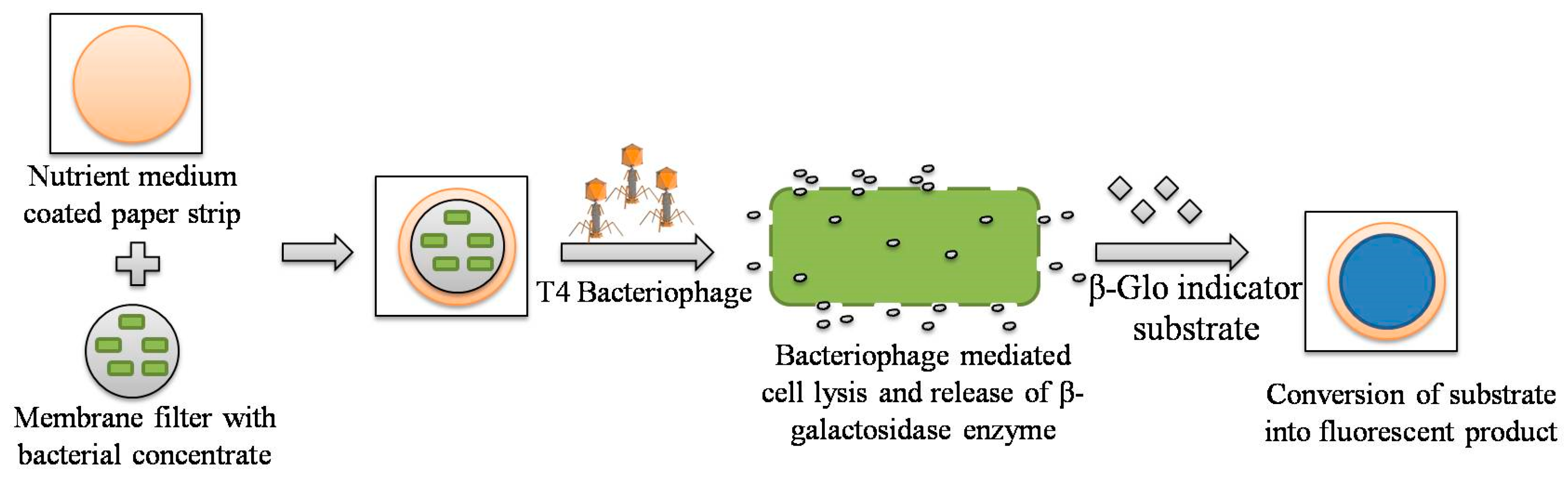
Hand-held, paper-based biosensor which uses the T4 bacteriophage to detect E. coli in water.

Multiple paper devices have been reported for the detection of E. coli specifically in water samples. One such device utilizes a recombinant version of the T4 bacteriophage which carries the gene for β-galactosidase. Water samples are filtered using membrane filters, then the filter papers are placed into the paper-based device which contains nutrient medium. They are then incubated for 4 hours at 37 °C. Next, the bacteriophage and the β-galactosidase indicator substrate are added to the sample. This causes the cells to lyse and release the β-galactosidase enzyme, which triggers the conversion of the substrate into a fluorescent product, indicative of the presence of the pathogen. Fluorescence is detected using a luminescence imaging device. The device was found to be highly specific to E. coli, and was tested against the presence of Enterobacter cloacae, Aeromonas hydrophila, and Salmonella Typhimurium. It has a detection limit of less than 10 CFU/mL, which is considered quite sensitive.

==== Detection via blotting paper ====
Another device, called DipTest, has also been developed to detect E. coli. It utilizes porous cellulose blotting paper. One end of the paper strip is coated in a hydrophobic material, while the other is coated with a chemoattractant - a substance which attracts cells based on their chemical properties. At the hydrophobic end, customized chemical reagents are imbedded in the paper in a reaction zone. The paper is dipped in the water sample, and if E. coli is present, it will be attracted to the chemoattractant at one end of the paper. The bacterial cells will then move up the paper via capillary action, and once it reaches the reaction zone, it reacts with the reagents to produce a pink to red color.

=== For detecting Salmonella ===
One paper-based biosensor that can be used to detect Salmonella, as well as E. coli, uses the nanomaterial graphene. These strips are a form of lateral flow assay, where the test line is composed of fluorescence antibody-labeled CdSe/ZnS quantum dots (Ab-QDs) as probes. After the sample has been applied, graphene oxide is added and it functions as the revealing agent. An energy transfer takes place between a donor molecule and an acceptor molecule. When no Salmonella is present, the Ab-QDs function as the donor, with graphene being the acceptor, and the fluorescence of the test line is quenched by this energy transfer. The presence of Salmonella, on the other hand, allows for fluorescence because of the manner in which the bacterial cells bind to the Ab-QDs: the distance between the donor and acceptor is too large to allow for the energy transfer, and thus fluorescence is not quenched. The strips have a detection limit of 100 CFU/mL.

== Applications ==
=== Context ===
Annually, over 1.6 million people die as a result of pathogens from contaminated water. In the developing world, 2,200 children die per day from waterborne diseases. Per World Health Organization (WHO) standards, for water to be considered clean enough for drinking, bacteria should be undetectable in any 100 mL sample. The primary contaminants of water are pathogens, such as the bacteria Campylobacter, Clostridium, Salmonella, Staphylococcous, Anabaena, Microcystis, worms such as Schistosoma mansoni, and Taenia saginata, protozoans such as Entamoeba histolytica and Giardia duodenalis, and viruses and fungi such as enteroviruses and microsporidia. Outbreaks of waterborne diseases, such as cholera, have affected millions in the 19th and 20th centuries over the course of several pandemics, usually as a result of inadequate wastewater treatment systems and general sanitation. This is not a problem of decades past, however. As recently as 2015, it was found that 1.3 billion people are at risk for cholera annually, with 2.86 million annual cases and an estimated 95,000 deaths. Cholera is just one example of waterborne disease, however, and more broadly, 780 million people worldwide still lack access to clean drinking water.

=== Benefits ===
Traditional methods for detecting contamination in water, though highly accurate and sensitive, pose a number of obstacles. They are often costly, require the operation of a trained technician, and are labor intensive. They can also be time consuming, for example, microbiological assays necessitate growing and isolating the pathogen from the sample, which can take several days or even weeks, in addition to preparing media. Paper-based biosensors address many of these problems. Specifically, paper as a material has several benefits. No external power is required, as the sample travels through the device via capillary action. Its fiber network structure allows for the storage of the necessary reagents in an active form. It is also cost-effective, has a high surface area to volume ratio, absorbs the sample efficiently, and is easily disposable by incineration.

In general, settings with limited resources could benefit from low-cost, easy to use, on-site, and rapid testing of water samples. In addition, there is a need for home-care testing. Widespread distribution of adequate but low-cost diagnostic devices, such as paper-based biosensors, could potentially alleviate disease burden. Beyond that, it could also result in more accurate epidemiological case data which could improve disease models.

=== Limitations ===
The most significant limitation of this technology is its sensitivity, in other words, its ability to detect very low levels of a contaminant in the sample. Some of the most sensitive ELISAs can detect contaminants at levels as low as 20 CFU/mL. In addition to improving accuracy - the correct identification of a particular pathogen - another challenge is developing biosensors which can readily distinguish between types of pathogens. Finally, the material of paper itself, while it offers many benefits, has some drawbacks, too. For example, there is a limit to how well paper devices can control the rate and direction of flow of the sample. This introduces limitations regarding the handling of complex chemical compounds or managing multistep assays, depending on the biosensor in question.
