= Stefan Krauss Deiml =

Professor at University of Oslo, Norway

Stefan Krauss Deiml is professor at the University of Oslo and Oslo University Hospital. Since 2017, he is heading the Hybrid Technology Hub - Centre of Excellence that focuses on micorphysiological systems. He is known for the discovery of the key vertebrate morphogen sonic hedgehog (Shh).

His current research includes preclinical work on WNT signalling pathway inhibitors, liver organoid development, integration on chip, microphysiological systems for modeling age dependent processes and stem cell derived embryo models.
