= Lung-on-a-chip =

Organ-on-a-chip device

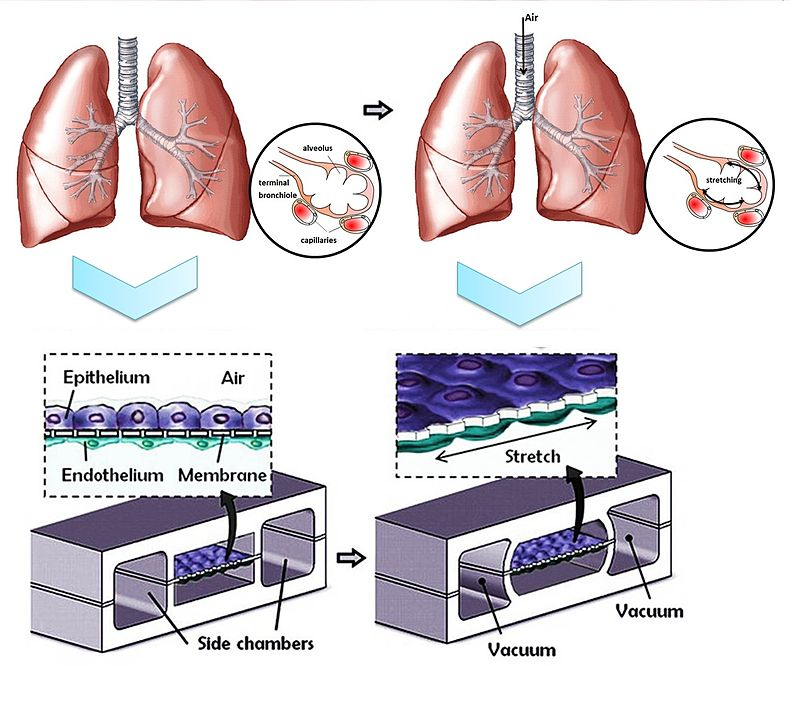
Schematic drawing of a lung-on-a-chip. The membrane in the middle can be stretched by vacuum in the two side chambers.

Lung-on-a-chip (LoC), also known as Lung Chips, are micro- and millifluidic organ-on-a-chip devices designed to replicate the structure and function of the human lung, mimicking the breathing motions and fluid dynamics that occur during inhalation and exhalation. LoCs represent the most promising alternative to replace animal testing.

== Concept ==
Huh et al. developed the first polydimethylsiloxane (PDMS)-based microfluidic system for culturing primary diseased small airway epithelial cells at the air-liquid interface (ALI). Despite its simplicity, this system successfully replicated crackling sounds associated with mechanical injury in the airway lumen. This would serve as the earliest precursor of today's modern LoC systems.

The first LoC, published in the June 25, 2010, issue of Science, was developed by Dan Huh and Donald E. Ingber at the Wyss Institute. This device integrated human lung and blood vessel cells, it served to demonstrated the ability of LoC's to recapitulate normal lung physiology. Additionally the device predicted the absorption of airborne nanoparticles and mimicked the inflammatory response triggered by microbial pathogens.

General LoC construction

In its most basic configuration LoC systems are constructed from a biocompatible bases usually PDMS, relevant cell lines and microfluidic channels and pumps which drive the culture media across the platform. Etched into the PDMS base are intricate microfluidic channels that are transferred onto the material using a microfabrication technique called soft lithography, which was pioneered by George M. Whitesides. Computer aided design software allows researchers to design intricate channels and compartments to meet their design needs.

Once a microfluidic channel design is finalized and transferred on to the desired base, most alveolar chips are lined with epithelial cells on the apical side and endothelial cells on the basal side separated by a semipermeable material like PDMS. A culture medium flows in on basal side and acts to provide the necessary nutrients to the cell culture as well as mimic blood flow through the device. On the apical side endothelial cell are left open to the air as to recreate a air-liquid interface within the device.

Aside from the basic device channel design and relevant cell types, most devices choose to add a vacuum mechanism within the chip to allow for the cyclic mechanical stretch of the device. This constant stretching mechanism is an attempt to replicate the normal stretch a human lung experiences during a normal respiratory cycle and adds to the physiologic relevance of the device. Some devices stretch in two dimensions while more complex versions stretch in three dimensions.

Many modern systems have attempted to add a third layer to the LoC systems which is intended to mimic the interstitial layer of the alveolus. This thirds layer replaces the PDMS semipermeable portion in between the apical and basal sides. This is thought better mimic the alveolar network within the lung and help replicate inflammatory changes that occurs in the interstitial space during a diseased state. Of note some systems have used nano-spun microfibers while other use elastin-collagen composites.

Ultimately these devises are being used to recreate normal physiology, better characterize pathology, and serves as a preclinical model for therapeutic development. Since the introduction of LoCs in 2010, numerous advancements have been made to develop valid, functional, and clinically relevant models.

== Shortcoming ==
The breathing movements in typical LoC such as Wyss platform occur in 2D, rather than the physiologically relevant three-dimensional (3D) format. Most organ-on-chip models, including LoC, are made from PDMS, which has several limitations. For example, the two-compartment platform chip, similar to the Wyss chip, is at least 10-15 times thicker than its in vivo counterpart (the commercial Wyss chip has a thickness of 50 μm according to its datasheet). This increased thickness is significant because it impedes the cross-talk between the two sides of the PDMS membranes.

The main issue with PDMS is its adsorption properties, which lead to unrealistic ADME and, consequently, inaccurate pharmacokinetics analysis. Other limitations of PDMS include biodegradation, leaching, cell delamination, and molecule absorption, all of which affect the accuracy and reliability of cell assays.
