= Electrochemical aptamer-based biosensors =

Aptamers, single-stranded RNA and DNA sequences, bind to an analyte and change their conformation. They function as nucleic acids selectively binding molecules such as proteins, bacteria cells, metal ions, etc. Aptamers can be developed to have precise specificity to bind to a desired target. Aptamers change conformation upon binding, altering the electrochemical properties which can be measured. The Systematic Evolution of Ligands by Exponential Enrichment (SELEX) process generates aptamers. Electrochemical aptamer-based (E-AB) biosensors is a device that takes advantage of the electrochemical and biological properties of aptamers to take real time, in vivo measurements.

An electrochemical aptamer-based (E-AB) biosensor generates an electrochemical signal in response to specific target binding in vivo The signal is measured by a change in Faradaic current passed through an electrode. E-AB sensors are advantageous over previously reported aptamer-based sensors, such as fluorescence generating aptamers, due to their ability to detect target binding in vivo with real-time measurements. An E-AB sensor is composed of a three-electrode cell: an interrogating (or working) electrode, a reference electrode, and a counter electrode. A signal is generated within the electrochemical cell then measured and analyzed by a potentiostat. Several biochemical and electrochemical parameters optimize signal gain for E-AB biosensors. The density packing of DNA or RNA aptamers, the ACV frequency administered by the potentiostat, and the chemistry of the self assembling monolayer (SAM) are all factors that determine signal gain as well as the signal to noise ratio of target binding. E-AB biosensors provide a promising mechanism for in-situ sensing, feedback-controlled drug administration, and cancer biomarkers.

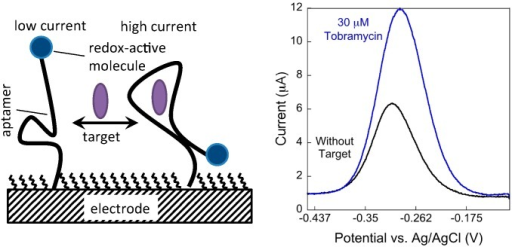
Left: This image displays the electrode surface upon which the aptamer is immobilized and the self assembling monolayer (SAM) passivates the surface where aptamers are not bound. The redox reporter (blue) is far away from the gold electrode on the unfolded (or partially unfolded) DNA in the absence of target molecule (purple). Upon target binding, the DNA changes structure by folding, bringing the redox reporter closer to the electrode surface. Right: The change in current produces a signal relative to the baseline. The baseline signal is the signal generated without target. The baseline represents the redox activity of the aptamer vs. Ag/AgCl.

== Signal generation ==
The DNA or RNA aptamers are fixed on the interrogating electrode, where a redox reaction is reported by a redox tag. Gold is often used as the probe surface for interrogating electrodes. The surface of the gold electrode is packed with redox-tagged DNA or RNA aptamers. The redox reporter is often methylene blue. Upon target binding, the aptamer changes structure by folding, bringing the redox reporter closer to the gold electrode. This increase in proximity from the redox-reporter to the electrode enables faster electron transfer from the redox tag to the gold electrode. The increase in speed of electron transfer contributes to a change in Faradaic current that is detected by the potentiostat.

The reference electrode is the site of a known chemical reaction that has a known redox potential. For example, a reference electrode that harbors the reaction of silver-silver chloride (Ag/AgCl) has a fixed redox potential and is the measuring point for the redox potential of the interrogating electrode. The counter electrode (or auxiliary electrode) acts as a cathode or anode to the interrogating electrode. The applied voltage is not passed through the reference electrode due to an impedance supplied by the potentiostat. Therefore, the potential generated within the electrochemical cell is attributed to the interrogating electrode. Current is measured as potential of the interrogating electrode vs. the fixed potential of the reference electrode. The difference in potential is what produces the current in the external circuit and generates a signal. The signal quantifies target binding depending on electron transfer that is stoichiometrically proportional to target binding.

Four electrode method has also been demonstrated in an electrochemical nanoporous alumina membrane sensor, where the aptamer was grafted onto the membrane and not on the electrode. The binding of the aptamer with the target protein produces a change in impedance of the membrane which is picked up by the electrochemical sensor using an impedance spectroscopy analyzer. This approach could be beneficial in cases where the electric field of the electrode can change the aptamer structure or the biointerface which may decrease the sensing ability.

== Signal optimization ==
There are several parameters to consider for optimization of binding-induced electrochemical signal gain. The aptamer probe packing density, the nature of the self-assembling monolayer, and the ACV frequency are factors that affect detecting and measuring of signal. Two main factors are considered when fabricating the packing density on the probe surface. The concentration of aptamer and the surface chemistry of the self-assembling monolayer (SAM) enable variations of desired probe packing density.

=== Aptamer packing density ===
The density of aptamer packing on the electrode surface is an important parameter to optimize signal. Depending on the size and nature of target molecule, different aptamer packing densities favor signal gain. Studies have shown that small target molecules enable a greater signal gain for low density aptamer packing, while larger proteins as a target generate the greatest signal at intermediate probe packing densities. Signal gain decreases as packing density increase above the range of optimal signal gain due to steric hindrance. When the probe surface neighboring an aptamer is blocked by an adjacent aptamer, the redox tag on the target-bound aptamer will not have room to come into contact with the electrode, therefore failing to report target binding. The concentration of aptamer in solution that incubates a clean probe is found to be proportional to the density of aptamers that are immobilized on the probe. Studies have reported suggesting that small targets such as cocaine E-AB sensors generate the most signal with the lowest probe packing density. Conversely, larger protein targets such as the protein Thrombin generate the most signal at intermediate probe packing densities.

=== SAM nature and surface chemistry ===
Consecutively, the probe is incubated in a SAM to make the surface of the probe that is unoccupied unreactive to target or further aptamer binding. The optimized SAM thickness is thick enough for the surface to be passivated against target binding and thin enough to transfer electrons from the redox reporter to the electrode. SAM thickness can be measured as length. It has been reported that cocaine E-AB sensors generate more signal when the SAM is thinner and therefore more conductive. However, reducing the SAM from 6 carbons to 2 carbons decreases signal, and peak current is generated using a 6-carbon SAM.

=== ACV frequency ===
The ACV frequency is used to monitor the Faradaic current, which quantifies target binding. The generation of signal has been reported to be insensitive to ACV frequency as long as the ACV is in a sensible range, therefore, not too low to be detected or too fast. The ACV frequency is used instead of a single-directional current to protect the degradation of the electrodes. Square wave voltammetry is applied and measured to analyze the change in current as the voltage is swept linearly across an electrode.

== Aptamer generation ==
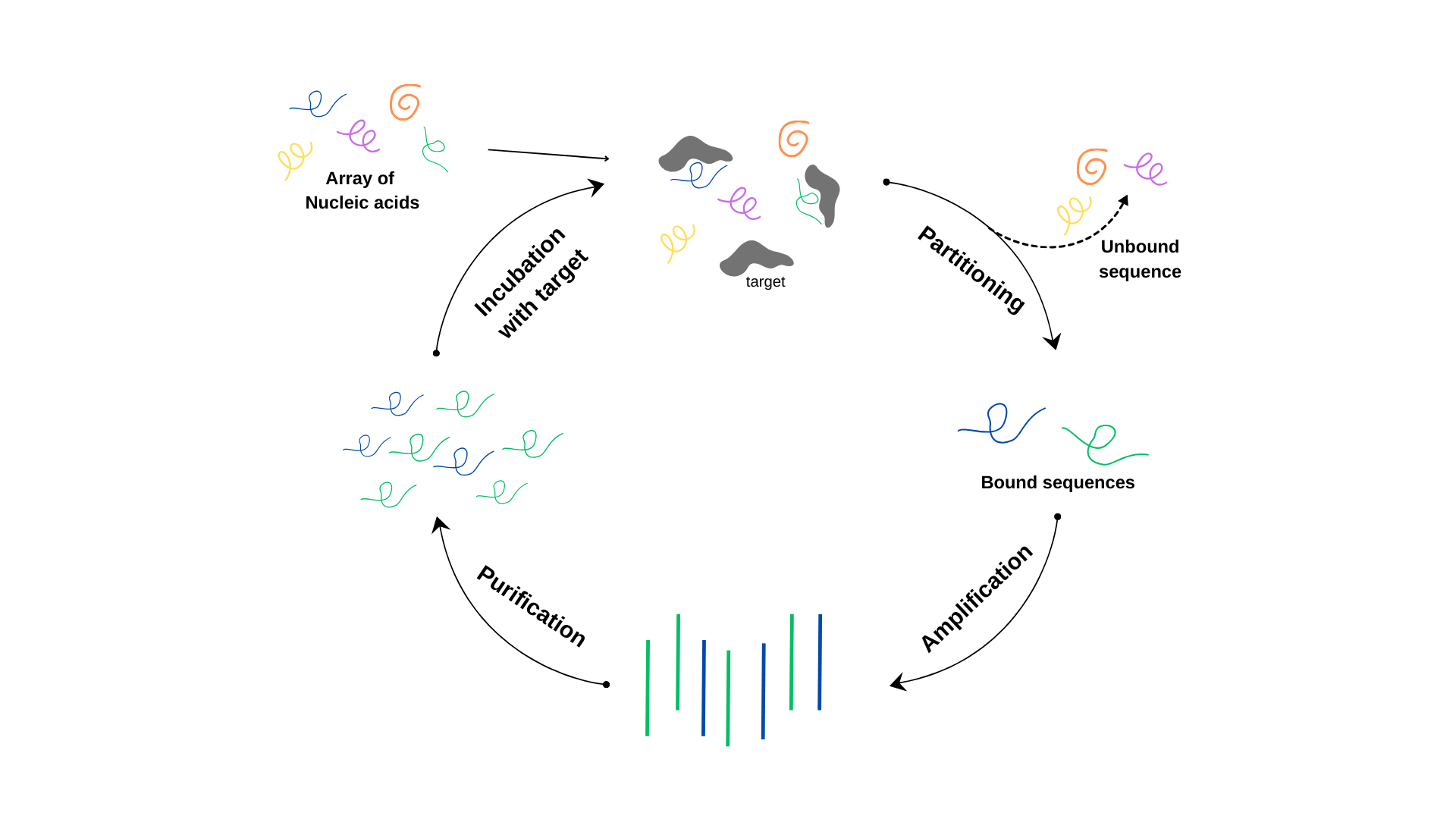
Image illustrates the SELEX process for aptamer selection. The nucleic acid array is incubated with the target, followed by separation to eliminate unbound sequences. The binding sequences undergo amplification and purification to remove complementary strands.

Design and fabrication of E-AB aptamers is consistent with methods used for previously reported aptamers. SELEX is a well known selection method for fabrication and selection of nucleotide aptamers. In 1990s, scientists introduced SELEX. Aptamers are chosen based on their in vitro target recognition through this process. In SELEX, aptamers are chosen based on their ability to recognize specific targets. This method involves three key steps: First, single-stranded nucleic acids are bound to the target. Next, the bound nucleic acids are separated from unbound ones. Finally, Polymerase Chain Reaction (PCR) amplifies the nucleic acids that have an affinity for the target, allowing for further screening or functional analysis. Following SELEX, high-throughput sequencing is used to identify sequences that have been enriched due to their target-binding abilities. SELEX is relatively limited by the amount of enrichment that can be achieved in a single round. A less-reported screening method for aptamer fabrication that overcomes this limitation is affinity-based library enrichment that has been termed Particle Display.

=== Particle Display ===
Particle Display produces higher yields of higher affinity aptamers in less rounds than conventional selection methods. In this method, libraries of aptamers are separated into aptamer particles and separated by fluorescence-activated cell sorting based on affinity. Only the highest affinity aptamer particles are isolated and sequenced into aptamers. This is an affinity-base selection process that is more efficient than selection methods such as SELEX. Particle display may be a reliable aptamer generation method for E-AB sensors due to the high affinity and specificity of target binding.

Researchers tackled the challenge of isolating high-affinity aptamers in conventional SELEX by introducing Particle Display System (PDS). Using parallel single-molecule emulsion polymerase chain reaction (PCR) for monoclonal aptamer screening, PDS employs emulsion PCR and droplet digital PCR to prevent by-product propagation and preserve rare high-affinity sequences. The one-particle-one-sequence nature of PDS transforms the DNA-target interaction into a particle-target interaction, enabling swift confirmation of aptamer candidate affinities through fluorescence-activated cell sorting or flow cytometry assays. Unlike conventional SELEX, PDS efficiently segregates aptamers, providing a streamlined and effective method for identifying and isolating high-affinity binders. PDS significantly enhances the efficiency of enriching high-affinity aptamers, achieving this in a single round of screening.

Particle display yields higher quantities of higher affinity aptamers in fewer rounds compared to conventional selection methods. This method separates aptamer libraries into aptamer particles and employs fluorescence-activated cell sorting to isolate particles based on affinity. Only the highest affinity aptamer particles are isolated and sequenced into aptamers. This affinity-based selection process is more efficient than methods such as SELEX. Particle display may be a reliable aptamer generation method for E-AB sensors due to the high affinity and specificity of target binding

== Advantages ==
EAB sensors possess the potential to significantly advance our comprehension of metabolism, endocrinology, pharmacokinetics, and neurochemistry as valuable research tools. Specifically, these sensors offer improved resolution and more quantitative measurements of phenomena such as drug delivery, clearance, and the maintenance of metabolic homeostasis. With their capability for feedback control, EAB sensors also present unprecedented opportunities to elucidate the correlation between, for instance, plasma drug levels and subsequent clinical or behavioral responses. The simultaneous measurements performed by EAB sensors in multiple body locations can enhance our understanding of drug and metabolite transport within and between bodily compartments. Beyond in-body measurements, EAB sensors could be beneficial for real-time monitoring in cell culture applications, ranging from small-scale (e.g., "organ on a chip") to industrial scale (e.g., monitoring industrial bioreactors). They have already demonstrated utility in applications such as monitoring ATP release in astrocytes and detecting serotonin in cell culture using glass nanopipettes.

Aptamers, referred to as "chemical antibodies," are used in therapeutics and biosensing due to their specific recognition and binding capabilities toward target molecules. They offer advantages over classical antibodies as they are significantly lighter, easily penetrate intracellular targets, can be synthetically produced, are non-immunogenic, and exhibit stability. Aptamers excel in discerning proteins, demonstrating precision in diagnostics and therapeutics, and have applications in laboratory assays and separations, particularly in biomolecule purification, chiral separation, and biochemical assays. The ability of aptamers to undergo conformational changes makes them ideal for developing quenching-based biosensors, showcasing flexibility that antibodies lack. Unlike antibodies, which are prone to cross-reactivity and batch variations, aptamers offer customizable selectivity and stability. This is particularly evident in biosensor applications targeting low-molecular-weight entities like small molecules

== Limitations ==
In E-AB sensors, the signal between electrochemical response and absence of target is small. The aptamer can be reengineered to a large-scale, conformational change. Long flexible loops or complementary strands can also force a change in the aptamers conformation. These techniques to modify aptamers increase the signal ratio, but does not guarantee that it is sufficient to be measured.

E-AB sensors are only as sensitive as the aptamer deployed. The selectivity of the aptamer can be a concern when there are similar compounds in the blood or other bodily fluids. cross-reactivity causes interference in in-vivo monitoring and requires understanding of how the aptamer reacts with similar compounds that may be in the sample.

== Promising applications ==
E-AB biosensors as basis for controlled drug delivery. Feedback-controlled drug delivery for continuous drug administration with dosage levels based on integrating E-AB signal calculations into a drug administering medical device. E-AB biosensors do not require reagents, are inexpensive compared to antibody detection methods, can be used in blood or other fluids with high abundance of non-target molecules, and they are reusable. These are all factors that make E-AB biosensors a promising method for feedback-controlled drug delivery dependent on integrated calculations of computer programming.

=== Research Applications ===
EAB sensors possess the potential to significantly advance our comprehension of metabolism, endocrinology, pharmacokinetics, and neurochemistry as valuable research tools. Specifically, these sensors offer improved resolution and more quantitative measurements of phenomena such as drug delivery, clearance, and the maintenance of metabolic homeostasis. Due to their capability for feedback control, E-AB sensors also present unprecedented opportunities to elucidate the correlation between, for instance, plasma drug levels and subsequent clinical or behavioral responses. The simultaneous measurements performed by E-AB sensors in multiple body locations can enhance our understanding of drug and metabolite transport within and between bodily compartments. Beyond in-body measurements, E-AB sensors could be beneficial for real-time monitoring in cell culture applications, ranging from small-scale (e.g., "organ on a chip") to industrial scale (e.g., monitoring industrial bioreactors). They have already demonstrated utility in applications such as monitoring ATP release in astrocytes and detecting serotonin in cell culture using glass nanopipettes.

=== Clinical Applications ===
E-AB sensors can be adapted into wearable devices that monitor health of patients in real time. E-AB sensors are capable of monitoring specific biomarkers that can aid in detection of diseases in early stages. For example, the measurement of C-reactive protein can aid in detection of heart attacks on a wearable device.

E-AB sensors offer groundbreaking possibilities for monitoring molecules within the intricate in-vivo environment, with transformative applications in clinical settings. E-AB sensing platforms could be integrated into a wearable device, comparable to continuous glucose monitors. This would be useful for the real-time measurements of drugs and biomarkers reflective of health and disease. Applications of E-AB sensors in the interstitial skin region show potential for clinical use as well.

In instances where sepsis is suspected, the monitoring of infection biomarkers, such as C-reactive protein, stands out as a potentially life-saving approach, providing critical insights into disease prognosis and severity. Similarly, for individuals at high cardiac risk, the deployment of a convenient wearable device could facilitate early detection of heart attacks, considering the association of specific biomarkers like troponin with the onset of cardiac events. The exceptional capability of E-AB sensors to measure picomolar concentrations of specific proteins in real-time within complex sample matrices positions the platform as a well-suited tool for such clinical monitoring applications.

Expanding beyond disease detection, E-AB sensors hold the promise of revolutionizing drug dosing practices, particularly in the realm of precision medicine. The prevalent approach to pharmaceutical dosing, grounded in assumptions about the average individual's drug absorption and response, falls short for drugs with narrow therapeutic windows relative to patient variability. Current dosing methodologies, relying on slow and infrequent blood draws or waiting for observable side effects, entail potential risks of underdosing or overdosing. E-AB sensors, with their capability to provide real-time insights into plasma drug levels, present an avenue for significantly enhancing the safety and efficacy of pharmacological treatments through improved therapeutic drug monitoring.

== See also ==
- Aptamer
