= Open microfluidics =

Microfluidics refers to the flow of fluid in channels or networks with at least one dimension on the micron scale. In open microfluidics, also referred to as open surface microfluidics or open-space microfluidics, at least one boundary confining the fluid flow of a system is removed, exposing the fluid to air or another interface such as a second fluid.

== Types of open microfluidics ==
Open microfluidics can be categorized into various subsets. Some examples of these subsets include open-channel microfluidics, paper-based, and thread-based microfluidics.

=== Open-channel microfluidics ===
In open-channel microfluidics, a surface tension-driven capillary flow occurs and is referred to as spontaneous capillary flow (SCF). SCF occurs when the pressure at the advancing meniscus is negative. The geometry of the channel and contact angle of fluids has been shown to produce SCF if the following equation is true.

  
    
      
        
          
            
              p
              f
            
            
              p
              w
            
          
        
        <
        c
        o
        s
        (
        θ
        )
      
    
    {\displaystyle {pf \over pw}<cos(\theta )}
  

Where pf is the free perimeter of the channel (i.e., the interface not in contact with the channel wall), and pw is the wetted perimeter (i.e., the walls in contact with the fluid), and θ is the contact angle of the fluid on the material of the device.

=== Paper-based microfluidics ===
Paper-based microfluidics utilizes the wicking ability of paper for functional readouts. Paper-based microfluidics is an attractive method because paper is cheap, easily accessible, and has a low environmental impact. Paper is also versatile because it is available in various thicknesses and pore sizes. Coatings such as wax have been used to guide flow in paper microfluidics. In some cases, dissolvable barriers have been used to create boundaries on the paper and control the fluid flow. The application of paper as a diagnostic tool has shown to be powerful because it has successfully been used to detect glucose levels, bacteria, viruses, and other components in whole blood. Cell culture methods within paper have also been developed. Lateral flow immunoassays, such as those used in pregnancy tests, are one example of the application of paper for point of care or home-based diagnostics. Disadvantages include difficulty of fluid retention and high limits of detection.

=== Thread-based microfluidics ===
Thread-based microfluidics, an offshoot from paper-based microfluidics, utilizes the same capillary based wicking capabilities. Common thread materials include nitrocellulose, rayon, nylon, hemp, wool, polyester, and silk. Threads are versatile because they can be woven to form specific patterns. Additionally, two or more threads can converge together in a knot bringing two separate ‘streams’ of fluid together as a reagent mixing method. Threads are also relatively strong and difficult to break from handling which makes them stable over time and easy to transport. Thread-based microfluidics has been applied to 3D tissue engineering and chemical analysis.

== Capillary filaments in open microfluidics ==
Open capillary microfluidics are channels that expose fluids to open air by excluding the ceiling and/or floor of the channel. Rather than rely on using pumps or syringes to maintain flow, open capillary microfluidics uses surface tension to facilitate the flow. The elimination of and infusion source reduces the size of the device and associated apparatus, along with other aspects that could obstruct their use. The dynamics of capillary-driven flow in open microfluidics are highly reliant on two types of geometric channels commonly known as either rectangular U-grooves or triangular V-grooves. The geometry of the channels dictates the flow along the interior walls fabricated with various ever-evolving processes.

=== Capillary filaments in U-groove ===
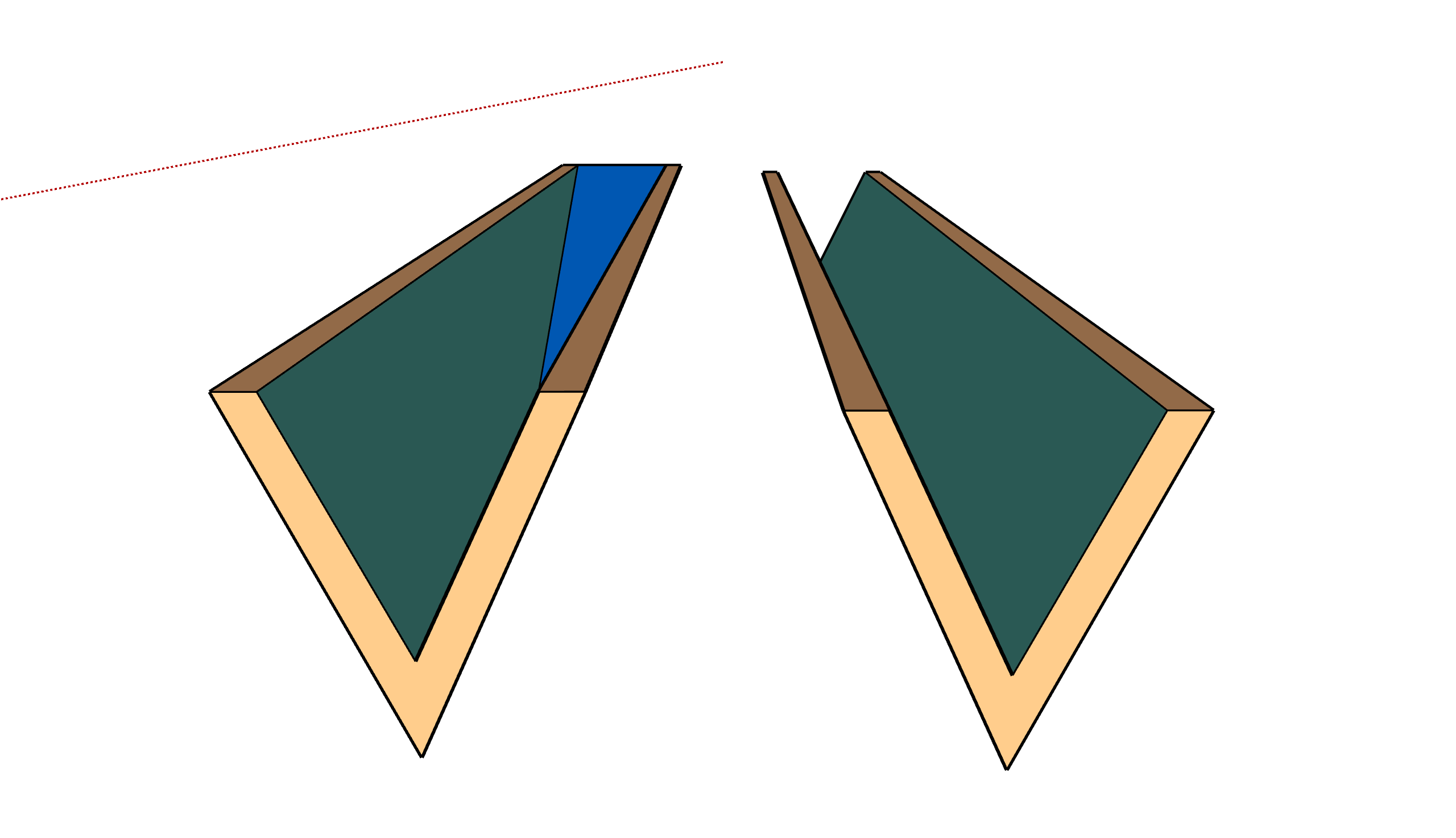
SCF in V-groove (left) V-groove open microfluidic channel (right)

Rectangular open-surface U-grooves are the easiest type of open microfluidic channel to fabricate. This design can maintain the same order of magnitude velocity in comparison to V-groove. Channels are made of glass or high clarity glass substitutes such as polymethyl methacrylate (PMMA), polycarbonate (PC), or cyclic olefin copolymer (COC). To eliminate the remaining resistance after etching, channels are given hydrophilic treatment using oxygen plasma or deep reactive-ion etching(DRIE).

=== Capillary filaments in V-groove ===
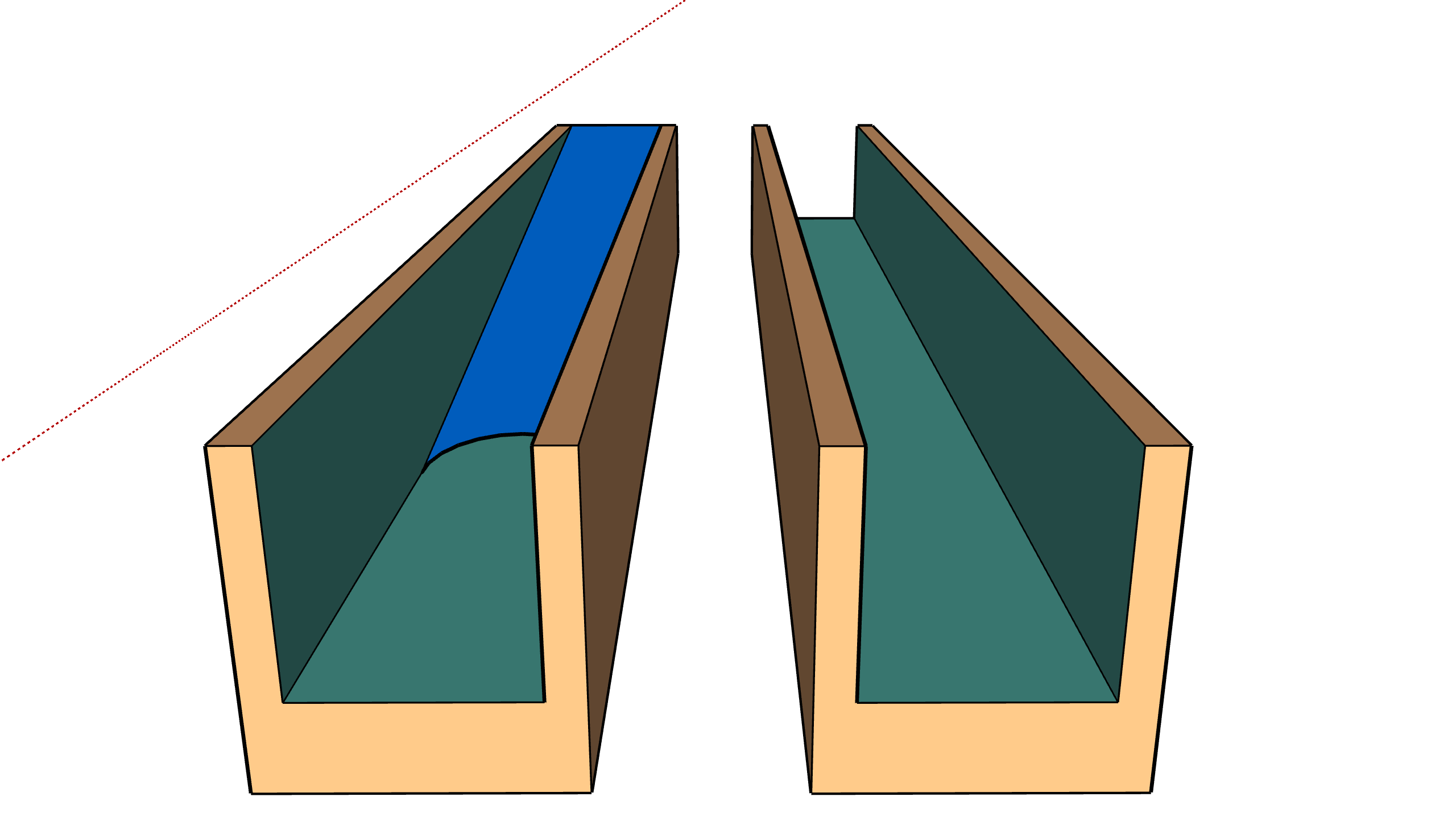
SCF in U-groove (left) U-groove open microfluidic channel SCF (right)

V-groove, unlike U-groove, allows for a variety of velocities depending on the groove angle. V-grooves with sharp groove angle result in the interface curvature at the corners explained by reduced Concus-Finn conditions. In a perfect inner corner of a V-groove, the filament will advance indefinitely in the groove allowing the formation of capillary filament depending on the wetting conditions. The width of the groove plays an important role in controlling the fluid flow. The narrower the V-groove is, the better the capillary flow of liquids is even for highly viscous liquids such as blood; this effect has been used to produce an autonomous assay. The fabrication of a V-groove is more difficult than a U-groove as it poses a higher risk for faulty construction, since the corner has to be tightly sealed.

== Advantages ==
One of the main advantages of open microfluidics is ease of accessibility which enables intervention (i.e., for adding or removing reagents) to the flowing liquid in the system. Open microfluidics also allows simplicity of fabrication thus eliminating the need to bond surfaces. When one of the boundaries of a system is removed, a larger liquid-gas interface results, which enables liquid-gas reactions. Open microfluidic devices enable better optical transparency because at least one side of the system is not covered by the material which can reduce autofluorescence during imaging. Further, open systems minimize and sometimes eliminate bubble formation, a common problem in closed systems.

In closed system microfluidics, the flow in the channels is driven by pressure via pumps (syringe pumps), valves (trigger valves), or electrical field. An example of one of these methods for achieving low flow rates using temperature-controlled evaporation has been described for an open microfluidics system, allowing for long incubation hours for biological applications and requiring small sample volumes. Open system microfluidics enable surface-tension driven flow in channels thereby eliminating the need for external pumping methods. For example, some open microfluidic devices consist of a reservoir port and pumping port that can be filled with fluid using a pipette. Eliminating external pumping requirements lowers cost and enables device use in all laboratories with pipettes.

=== Materials Solutions ===
Thankfully, while many problems exist with PDMS, many solutions have also been developed. To address the negative hydrophobicity and porosity that PDMS exhibits, researchers have started to use coatings such as BSA (bovine serum albumin) or charged molecules to create a layer between the native PDMS and the cells. Other researchers have successfully employed several of the Pluronic surfactants, a tri-block copolymer that has two hydrophilic blocks surrounding a hydrophobic core often used to increase the hydrophilic nature of numerous substrates, and even borosilicate glass coatings to address the hydrophobicity problem. Interestingly, treatment with either of the prior two compounds can result in prevention of non-specific protein adsorption, as they (and other coatings) form stable adsorption interactions with the PDMS, which aides in reducing PDSM interference with cell culture media. These compounds and materials can affect surface properties and should be carefully tested to note the impact on cultured cells. Researchers developed 3D scaffolding systems to mimic in vivo environments so that more cells and cell types can grow in an effort to address the problem that not all cell types can grow on PDMS. Like coating the PDMS, 3D scaffolding systems employ alternatives materials like ECM (extracellular matrix) proteins so rather than not binding the native PDMS, cells are more likely to bind to the proteins. Lastly, researchers have addressed the permeability of PDMS to water vapor using some elegant solutions. For example, a portion of the microfluidic system can be designated for humidification and cast in PDMS, or other material like glass.

== Disadvantages ==
Some drawbacks of open microfluidics include evaporation, contamination, and limited flow rate. Open systems are susceptible to evaporation which can greatly affect readouts when fluid volumes are on the microscale. Additionally, due to the nature of open systems, they are more susceptible to contamination than closed systems. Cell culture and other methods where contamination or small particulates are a concern must be carefully performed to prevent contamination. Lastly, open systems have a limited flow rate because induced pressures cannot be used to drive flow.

=== Materials ===
Polydimethylsiloxane (PDMS) is an ideal material to fabricate microfluidic devices for cell culture applications due to several advantageous properties such as low processing costs, ease of manufacture, rapid prototyping, ease of surface modification, and cellular non-toxicity. While there are several benefits that arise from using native Polydimethylsiloxane (PDMS), there are also some drawbacks that researchers must account for in their experiments. First, PDMS is both hydrophobic and porous, meaning that small molecules or other hydrophobic molecules can be adsorbed onto it. Such molecules include anything from methyl- or alkyl-containing molecules, and even certain dyes like Nile Red. Researchers identified in 2008 that plasma could be used to reduce the hydrophobicity of PDMS, though it returned about two weeks after treatment. Some researchers postulate that integrating removable polycaprolactone (PCL) fiber-based electrospun scaffolds under NaOH treatment enhances hydrophilicity as well as mitigating hydrophobicity, while promoting more efficient cell communication. Another problem that arises with PDMS is that it can interfere with the media that circulates in the channels. Incomplete curing of PDMS channels can lead to PDMS leaching into the media and, even when complete curing takes place, components of the media can still unintentionally attach to free hydrophobic sites on the PDMS walls. Yet another problem arises with the gas permeability of PDMS. Most researchers take advantage of this to oxygenate both the PDMS and the circulating media, but this trait also makes the microfluidic system especially vulnerable to water vapor loss. Lastly, not all cell types can grow, or will grow at the same levels, on native PDMS. For instance, high levels of rapid cell death in two fibroblast types grown on native PDMS were observed as early as 1994, which posed problems for the widespread use of PDMS in microfluidic cell culture.

== Applications ==
Like many microfluidic technologies, open system microfluidics has been applied to nanotechnology, biotechnology, fuel cells, and point of care (POC) testing. For cell-based studies, open-channel microfluidic devices enable access to cells for single cell probing within the channel. Other applications include capillary gel electrophoresis, water-in-oil emulsions, and biosensors for POC systems. Suspended microfluidic devices, open microfluidic devices where the floor of the device is removed, have been used to study cellular diffusion and migration of cancer cells. Suspended and rail-based microfluidics have been used for micropatterning and studying cell communication.

=== Materials Solutions Applications ===
Applications of these solutions are still in use today, as seen by the following examples. In 2014, Lei et al. was testing the impedance of human oral cancer cells in the presence of cisplatin, a known anti-cancer drug, by molding the cells into a 3D scaffolding. The authors had noted from previous studies that cellular impedance could be correlated to cellular viability and proliferation in 2D cell culture and hoped to translate that correlation into 3D cell culture. Using agarose to create the 3D scaffolding, the researchers measured the growth and proliferation of human oral cancer cells in the presence and absence of cisplatin using fluorescent DNA assays and observed that there was indeed a correlation like that observed in 2D model. Not only did this prove that principles from 2D cell culture could be translated to 3D open microfluidic cell culture, but it also potentially lays the foundation for a more personalized treatment plan for cancer patients. They postulated that future developments could transform this method into an assay that could test patient cancer cell response to known anti-cancer drugs.

Another group used a similar method, but instead of creating a 3D scaffolding, they employed several different PDMS coatings to determine the best option for studying cancer stem cells. The group looked at BSA and ECM proteins and found that, while their experimental evidence supported BSA as the best coating for circulating cancer cells (CSC's), phenotypic changes did occur to the cells (namely, elongation), but did not impact the cells’ ability to perform normal cell functions. A key caveat to note here is that BSA is not a blanket solution that works for every cell type- different coatings work better or worse for certain cell types and these differences should be considered when developing an experiment.
