= Microphysiometry =

Measurement of life processes in the micrometer scale

Microphysiometry is the in vitro micro-measurement of the functions and activities of life or of living matter (as organs, tissues, or cells) and of the physical and chemical phenomena involved on a very small micrometer (μm) scale. The term microphysiometry emerged in the scientific literature at the end of the 1980s.

The primary parameters assessed in microphysiometry comprise pH and the concentration of dissolved oxygen, glucose, and lactic acid, with an emphasis on the first two. Measuring these parameters experimentally in combination with a fluidic system for cell culture maintenance and a defined application of drugs or toxins provides three quantitative output parameters: extracellular acidification rates (EAR), oxygen uptake rates (OUR), and rates of glucose consumption or lactate release that characterize the metabolic situation.

Due to the label-free nature of sensor-based measurements, dynamic monitoring of cells or tissues for several days or even longer is feasible. On an extended timescale, a dynamic analysis of a cell's metabolic response to an experimental treatment can distinguish acute effects (e.g., one hour after a treatment), early effects (e.g., at 24 hours), and delayed, chronic responses (e.g., at 96 hours). As stated by Alajoki et al., "The concept is that it is possible to detect receptor activation and other physiological changes in living cells by monitoring the activity of energy metabolism".

== See also ==
- Organ-on-a-chip
