= Paper-based microfluidics =

Paper-based microfluidics are microfluidic devices that consist of a series of hydrophilic cellulose or nitrocellulose fibers that transport fluid from an inlet through the porous medium to a desired outlet or region of the device, by means of capillary action. This technology builds on the conventional lateral flow test which is capable of detecting many infectious agents and chemical contaminants. The main advantage of this is that it is largely a passively controlled device unlike more complex microfluidic devices. Development of paper-based microfluidic devices began in the early 21st century to meet a need for inexpensive and portable medical diagnostic systems.

== Architecture ==
Paper-based microfluidic devices feature the following regions:

- Inlet: a substrate (typically cellulose) where liquids are dispensed manually.
- Channels: hydrophilic sub-millimeter networks that guide liquid throughout a device.
- Flow amplifiers: regions of varying geometry where the flow velocity is modified to impart a steady state flow of controllable velocity
- Flow resistors: a capillary element used to impart a reduced flow velocity in order to control the residence time of a fluid in a microfluidic device
- Barriers: hydrophobic regions that prevent fluid from leaving the channel.
- Outlets: location where a chemical or biochemical reaction takes place.

== Flow ==
The movement of fluid through a porous medium such as paper is governed by permeability (earth sciences), geometry and evaporation effects. Collectively these factors results in evaporation limited capillary penetration that can be tuned by controlling porosity and device geometry. Paper is a porous medium in which fluid is transported primarily by wicking and evaporation. The capillary flow during wetting can be approximated by Washburn's equation, which is derived from Jurin's law and the Hagen–Poiseuille equation. The average velocity of fluid flow is generalized as,
$$v=\frac{\gamma\cos\theta}{4\eta}\frac{1}{L}$$
where $\gamma$ is the surface tension, $\theta$ the contact angle, $\eta$ is the viscosity, and $L$ is the distance traveled by the liquid. More extensive models account for paper tortuosity, pore radius, and paper deformation.

Once the medium is fully wetted, subsequent flow is laminar and follows Darcy's law. The average velocity of fluid flow is generalized as,
$$v=-\frac{K}{\eta}\triangledown P$$
where $K$ is the medium permeability and $\triangledown P$ is the pressure gradient. One consequence of laminar flow is that mixing is difficult and based solely on diffusion, which is slower in porous systems.

== Manufacturing ==
Paper-based microfluidic devices can be manufactured based on the dimensions, i.e. 2D and 3D. To fabricate 2D paper-based microfluidics, variations of methods, such as wax printing, inkjet printing, photolithography, flexographic printing, plasma treatment, laser treatment, etching (microfabrication), screen printing, digital light processing (DLP) 3-D printer, and wax screening, have been employed. Further lamination of multiple paper microfluidics creates pseudo-3D microfluidics that could provide an additional dimension of the fluidic network and increase the complexity. Each technique aims to create hydrophobic physical barriers on hydrophilic paper that passively transport aqueous solutions. Biological and chemical reagents must then be deposited selectively along the device by either dipping the substrate into a reagent solution or locally spotting a reagent onto the substrate.

=== Wax printing ===
Wax printing uses a simple printer to pattern wax on paper in a desired design. The wax is then melted with a hotplate to create channels. This technique is fast and low cost, but has relatively low resolution due to the isotropy of the melted wax.

=== Inkjet printing ===
Inkjet printing requires coating paper in a hydrophobic polymer, and then selectively placing an ink that etches the polymer to reveal paper. This technique is low cost with high resolution, but is limited by the speed of placing one ink droplet at a time.

=== Photolithography ===
Photolithographic techniques are similar to inkjet printing, using a photomask to selectively etch a photoresist polymer. This technique has high resolution and is quick, but has high equipment and material costs.

=== DLP printing ===
This technique utilizes a DLP printing technique in which photo-curable resin polymers are exposed to lights to form hydrophobic boundaries of open microchannels in a porous paper. If the effects of evaporation are of concern in the specific application then two additional layers of the curable resin can be used on the top and bottom of the channel. Excess uncured resin is then cleaned off using ethanol. This technique has relatively low equipment costs and utilizes readily available materials making it a promising candidate for mass production of point of care diagnostic devices.

=== Plasma processing ===
In this technique, paper is first rendered hydrophobic using a hydrophobizing agent such as AKD or fluorocarbon plasma polymerization, and then O_{2} plasma etching with a mask is used to create hydrophilic patterns in the paper. One benefit of plasma based processes is that the complex designs and functionalities such as fully and semi-enclsoed channels, on-off flow switches, and fluid flow control channels can be incorporated relatively easily. However, cost of production is relatively higher than other fabrication methods.

== Analytical applications ==
=== Mass spectrometry ===
Paper-spray ionization is being rapidly developed as an interface for micro paper-based analytical devices μPAD and mass spectrometry. The technique, first described by Graham Cooks group at Purdue, involves applying a voltage to a triangular sheet of wet paper near the inlet of a mass spectrometer. Although the exact mechanism is not well understood, two modes of operation can occur: a multicone spray at high flow rates, and a single cone spray that occurs when solvent has been depleted. This is part of a larger effort to combine complex microfluidic manipulations with mass spectral detection. Wax printing hydrophobic barriers is a common method for creating distinct flow channels within paper devices, and this has been extended to μPAD-MS to enhance ionization efficiency (by enabling focusing of the analyte stream) and enable reaction mixing by wax printing on the triangular paper surface. Chromatographic separations have also been demonstrated on μPADs prior to paper-spray detection. Initially, paper-spray ionization was applied for the detection of small molecules, such as pharmaceuticals and drugs of abuse. However, it has also been shown that paper-spray ionization can ionize large proteins while retaining non-covalent interactions.

=== Separation methods ===
Few analytical detectors are truly specific for a single species; therefore some type of separation step is often necessary prior to detection. Moreover, separation allows for detection of multiple analytes within a single platform. Separations based upon planar chromatography (TLC) are perhaps the easiest to implement, since many μPADs are constructed with chromatographic paper. Typically, the separation channel is defined by wax-printing two hydrophobic barriers. Electrochemical detection is perhaps most common, likely due to its ease of implementation, although colorimetry, chemiluminscence, and mass spectral detection have also been used in conjunction with paper-based chromatographic separations. Despite the ease of implementation, planar chromatography is hindered by relatively low plate height (i.e., poor separation efficiency). Since the Chakraborty group demonstrated the feasibility of electrokinetic flow on μPADs, several applications of electrophoretic separations on μPADs have appeared in the literature. The Crooks group at UT-Austin successfully demonstrated that electrophoretic separations on μPADs could be accomplished at relatively low applied voltages compared to conventional electrophoretic devices due to the high field strengths that can be generated on very thin (180 μm) sheets of origami paper. Simpler separation methods can also be used on μPADs, for instance, the Henry group demonstrated the separation of plasma from whole blood using blood separation membranes.

== Flow control ==
There are various ways to control the fluid flow in the channels. They include changing the channel width and length, altering the wettability of the paper, diverting some fluid through a parallel channel, or changing the viscosity of the fluid. The flow in PADs can be turned off with dissolvable sugar bridges, Corona discharge treatment to alter a coating on the paper from a hydrophobic to hydrophilic state, or the use of an expandable polymer triggered by the flow to close the flow path.

== Electronic integration ==
Integration of microfluidic platforms and electronic components have the potential to generate micro total analysis systems (μTAS), which are devices that include and automate all essential steps for sample preparation and analysis. Paper electronics rely on functional structures like conductors to be fabricated on the surface of paper, but paper-based microfluidics rely on channels and barriers to be fabricated inside the substrate. This incompatibility led to a majority of μTAS being developed using external electrodes contacted with the paper channels. However, in 2009, screen-printed electrodes were integrated into a paper-based microfluidic device to create a biosensor for glucose, lactate, and uric acid. This first report of electronic integration for paper-based microfluidics illustrated how this can improve the design of μTAS at a low cost. Since then, a variety of electrode fabrication techniques have been developed, including screen printing, inkjet printing, metal sputter deposition, pencil drawing, laser-induced pyrolysis and external electrodes to create a network of conductive traces.

=== Screen printing ===
Screen printing is the most popular method to create electronic traces onto paper. In this process, the ink is transferred onto areas of the paper-based microfluidic channels using a stencil. Dungchai et al. demonstrated electrochemical sensing using screen-printed carbon ink for the working and counter electrodes and silver/silver chloride ink as the reference electrode at the end of the microfluidic channel. Screen-printed electrodes on paper-based microfluidic devices have been used not only to develop biosensors for metabolites, but also to detect bacteria and heavy metals in food and water. The scalabile nature of this process make it promising to create electrochemical devices at ultra-low cost suitable for field testing.

=== Inkjet printing ===
A promising physical technique is inkjet printing, which allows for conductive materials to be deposited in a precise and reproducible fashion onto paper. As a proof-of-concept, Ko et al. developed a paper-based electrical chip using a home office printer, an ink made of carbon nanotubes, and magazine paper. Similarly, silver nanoparticles were printed into microfluidic channels to sense changes in the permittivity of fluids, revealing information about concentration and mixing ratios. Research groups have found, however, that these nanoparticle containing inks can self-aggregate on the paper due to uneven drying, which leads to non-uniform coverage and non-linear responses. A promising physical technique is inkjet printing, which allows for conductive materials to be deposited in a precise and reproducible fashion onto paper. In this regards, the controlled growth of nanoparticles can help to improve conductivity and sensing performances. As the seeds clusters grow and interconnect inside of the paper fibers, there properties and structure of the final material can be controlled through the process and chemical conditions. A typical growth process conditions consist dissolved metal ions in a reductive chemical environment. Once the nanoparticles have grown, they can be functionalized with recognition biomolecules to increase the specificity and sensitivity of the microfluidic devices.

Inkjet printing is compatible with a wide variety of materials.

=== Metal sputtering ===
Sputtering of metals and metal oxide is one of the most established technique in cleanroom microfabrication. This approach has been adapted to sputter gold electrode onto paper-based microfluidic devices and demonstrated excellent performances DNA detection using quantum dots labels. One notable benefit of employing pure gold as the electrode material is the potential for leveraging self-assembled monolayer chemistry, which facilitates functionalization and anti-fouling of the electrode surface.

=== Pencil drawing ===
The pencil-on-paper technique is arguably the simplest and most accessible way of creating electrodes on paper-based microfluidics as it uses inexpensive, common office supplies. Here, graphitic circuitry is created on the paper-based microfluidic device by repeatedly sketching with a pencil. For example, this electrical integration method was used in a completely hand-drawn paper microfluidic device for point-of-care cancer screening. This solvent-free technique allows the potential to create improvised paper-based μTAS. However, pencil-on-paper can also lead to a non-uniform deposition of graphite, limiting the performance of these hand-drawn circuits. Additionally, even though the process can be automated, the repeated drawing procedure is poorly scalable.

=== Laser-induced pyrolysis ===
Laser-induced pyrolysis of cellulose represents a practical method for transforming the non-conductive paper into a graphene-like material, thereby offering a readily available means of patterning electrodes on paper. The electrodes are created in situ, and retain the porous and wicking propertie of the paper substrate, whilst demonstrating large electroactive surface area for sensing. Since the electrode are fully permeable to capillary flow, electrochemical flow-through devices can be built using this technology. Nevertheless, as a reagentless fabrication method, there is little room for tuning the surface properties and chemical composition of the resulting electrodes.

=== External electrodes ===
The advancement of technologies like 3D printing has enabled the creation of electrodes using simple and easily accessible equipment, leading to numerous instances where these electrodes are patterned as standalone units and subsequently integrated with paper-based microfluidic devices. To this end, there have been several examples of a thermoplastic electrode patterning and their use for electrochemical sensing, for example in flow injection analysis.

=== Other ===
Other physical integration methods (spray or spin coating, blending, and vacuum filtration) have been developed for paper electronics, but have yet to be implemented in paper-based microfluidic devices.

== Applications ==
The main advantage of paper-based microfluidic devices over traditional microfluidics devices is their potential for use in the field rather than in a laboratory. Filter paper is advantageous in a field setting because it is capable of removing contaminants from the sample and preventing them from moving down the microchannel. This means that particles will not inhibit the accuracy of paper-based assays when they are used outdoors. Paper-based microfluidic devices are also small in size (approximately a few mm to 2 cm in length and width) compared to other microfluidic platforms, such as droplet-based microfluidic devices, which often use glass slides up to 75 mm in length. Because of their small size and relatively durable material, paper-based microfluidic devices are portable. Paper-based devices are also relatively inexpensive. Filter paper is very cheap, and so are most of the patterning agents used in the fabrication of microchannels, including PDMS and wax. Most of the major paper-based fabrication methods also do not require expensive laboratory equipment. These characteristics of paper-based microfluidics make it ideal for point-of-care testing, particularly in countries that lack advanced medical diagnostic tools. Paper-based microfluidics has also been used to conduct environmental and food safety tests. The main issues in the application of this technology are the lack of research into the flow control techniques, accuracy, and precision, the need for simpler operator procedures in the field, and the scaling of production to meet the volume requirements of a global market. This is largely due to the focus in the industry on utilizing the current silicon based manufacturing channels to commercialized LOC technologies more efficiently and economically.

=== For diagnostics ===
The original goal for paper-based microfluidics (μPAD) was to make low-cost and user-friendly point-of-care (POC) devices that can be operated without the assistance of medical personnel or any other qualified specialist in resource-limited and rural areas. To achieve this goal, μPAD should fit the "Affordable, Sensitive, Specific, User-friendly, Rapid and robust, Equipment-free, Deliver" criteria, provided by the World Health Organization (WHO), which are the requirements for diagnostic testing for resource-constrained settings. However, in POC's official "Guide to aid the selection of diagnostic tests", it is stated that these criteria are generic and can be modified according to test application. The main problem of paper-based microfluidic diagnostics is that research in this field is directed on providing new concepts and ideas rather than on improving user acceptance and as a result, most μPAD devices are still unable to be interpreted by non-professional users. However, POC is not the only application of paper-based microfluidics for diagnostics. Recently, a paper was employed in the production of more complicated microfluidic analytical devices, called lab-on-a-chip (LOC) devices, which are also used in diagnostics. Using paper to make LOC devices instead of polydimethylsiloxane (PDMS) and glass can decrease cost and size while increasing portability. This allows LOC devices to become more accessible in resource-limited conditions.

=== Use of paper microfluidics in blood grouping ===
Recently, paper microfluidics was used in the fabrication of numerous immunological tests. Khan et al. in 2010 investigated a blood typing device based on the principle that red blood cell agglutination, triggered by specific antigeninteraction, drastically decreases blood wicking and transport on paper or chromatographic media. The concept was exhibited with a paper-based microfluidic device prototype, made from a filter paper shaped to a central zone with three extending channels. Each channel is treated with a different solution of antibody (Epiclone Anti-A, Anti-B, and Anti-D). Since μPADs were purposely created for use in resource-shortage conditions, it is highly important to provide the capability to analyze real samples like non-pretreated human blood and urine. This device is constructed to analyze whole-blood samples, which is an important step to increase the user acceptance of paper-based microfluidic diagnostics. The analysis is based on the wicking behavior of blood or antibody mixture on paper. Mixing blood samples with immunoglobulin M antibodies, specific for each blood group, causes agglutination of the red blood cells (RBC) by polymer bridging upon adsorption on the corresponding RBC antigens, and chromatographic separation of sample on the certain channel of the device occurs. Simultaneously, separation doesn't happen on hands soaked in non-specific antibody and the blood sample is weakened as a uniform and stable solution. From the evident difference in the transport of solution and channel appearance, one can identify the separation effect for the determination of blood type.

Noiphung et al. at 2014 followed up an approach in paper-based microfluidic blood typing using antibodies to cause red blood cells agglutination, and the group designed a new paper-based analytical device (PAD) for blood grouping that can be used for the synchronous performation of Rh and forward and reverse ABO blood grouping on the same device. Forward grouping is a blood typing procedure whereby patient red blood cells are mixed with Anti-A and Anti-B reagents. On the other hand, reverse typing is a blood typing procedure where patient serum is mixed with reagent A cells and reagent B cells. The results should be the opposite of forward typing. The designed device has two sides: forward (F) side, made of chromatography paper with three channels spotted with 1.5 mL Anti-A, Anti-B, and Anti-D antibody solutions each, and reverse (R) side, made with blood separation membrane and connected to A-type and B-type antibodies channels. The PAD is fabricated using a combination of wax dipping technologies to join Whatman chromatography paper and blood separation membrane. The device included three wax-printed channels for forward grouping, two of which were also applied for reverse grouping. While R-side was capable for whole blood sample analysis, Noiphung's group found that whole blood samples are too viscous to be directly applied on a paper-side of the device. During the experiment, it was determined that the optimal blood-water dilution ratio is 1:2. The blood typing was executed by measuring the ratio of red blood cells (RBC) and plasma transport distances. The accuracy of the proposed PADs in blood typing was 92%, 85%, 89%, 93%, and 96% for A, B, AB, O, and Rh+ blood types respectively.

=== Glucose detection ===
Paper-based microfluidic devices have been designed to monitor a wide variety of medical ailments. Glucose plays an important role in diabetes and cancer, and it can be detected through a catalytic cycle involving glucose oxidase, hydrogen peroxide, and horseradish peroxidase that initiates a reaction between glucose and a color indicator, frequently potassium iodide, on a paper-based microfluidic device. This is an example of colorimetric detection. The first paper-based microfluidic device, developed by George Whitesides' group at Harvard, was able to simultaneously detect protein as well as glucose via color-change reactions (potassium iodide reaction for glucose and tetrabromophenol blue reaction for the protein BSA). The bottom of the paper device is inserted into a sample solution prepared in-lab, and the amount of color change is observed. More recently, a paper-based microfluidic device using colorimetric detection was developed to quantify glucose in blood plasma. Blood plasma is separated from whole blood samples on a wax-printed device, where red blood cells are agglutinated by antibodies and the blood plasma is able to flow to a second compartment for the color-change reaction. Electrochemical detection has also been used in these devices. It provides greater sensitivity in quantification, whereas colorimetric detection is primarily used for qualitative assessments. Screen-printed electrodes and electrodes directly printed on filter paper have been used. One example of a paper-based microfluidic device utilizing electrochemical detection has a dumbbell shape to isolate plasma from whole blood. The current from the hydrogen peroxide produced in the aforementioned catalytic cycle is measured and converted into concentration of glucose.

=== 3D devices for glucose detection ===
Whitesides' group also developed a 3D paper-based microfluidic device for glucose detection that can produce calibration curves on-chip because of the improved fluid flow design. This 3D device consists of layers of paper patterned with microfluidic channels that are connected by layers of double-sided adhesive tape with holes. The holes in the tape permit flow between channels in alternating layers of paper, so this device allows for more complicated flow paths and enables the detection of multiple samples in a large number (up to ~1,000) of detection zones in the last layer of paper. More recently, 3D paper-based microfluidic devices assembled using origami were developed. Unlike Whitesides' design, these devices utilize a single layer of patterned paper that is then folded into multiple layers before sample solution is injected into the device. Subsequently, the device can be unfolded, and each layer of the device can be analyzed for the simultaneous detection of multiple analytes. This device is simpler and less expensive to fabricate than the aforementioned device using multiple layers of paper. Mixing between the channels in the different layers was not an issue in either device, so both devices were successful in quantifying glucose and BSA in multiple samples simultaneously.

=== Environmental and food safety tests ===
Paper-based microfluidic devices have several applications outside of the medical field. For example, paper-based biosensors have been used extensively in environmental monitoring. Two recent devices were developed for the detection of Salmonella and E. coli. The latter device was specifically used to detect E. coli in seven field water samples from Tucson, Arizona. Antibody-conjugated polystyrene particles were loaded in the middle of the microfluidic channel, after the sample inlet. Immunoagglutination occurs when samples containing Salmonella or E. coli, respectively, come into contact with these particles. The amount of immunoagglutination can be correlated with increased Mie scattering of light, which was detected with a specialized smartphone application under ambient light. Paper-based microfluidics has also been used to detect pesticides in food products, such as apple juice and milk. A recent design used piezoelectric inkjet printing to imprint paper with the enzyme acetylcholinesterase (AChE) and the substrate indophenyl acetate (IPA), and this paper-based microfluidic device was used to detect organophosphate pesticides (AChE inhibitors) via a decrease in blue-purple color. This device is distinguished by its use of bioactive paper instead of compartments with pre-stored reagents, and it was demonstrated to have good long-term stability, making it ideal for field use. A more recent paper-based microfluidic design utilized a sensor, consisting of fluorescently labeled single-stranded DNA (ssDNA) coupled with graphene oxide, on its surface to simultaneously detect heavy metals and antibiotics in food products. Heavy metals increased fluorescence intensity, whereas antibiotics decreased fluorescence intensity. Recently, paper-based devices have become very attractive for making inexpensive, disposable and convenient analytical devices for the determination of reactive phosphate in water. These devices utilize the molybdenum blue protocol for phosphate detection.
