= Organ-on-a-chip =

Nanotechnology simulation of human organ function

An organ-on-a-chip (OOC) is a multi-channel 3D microfluidic cell culture, integrated circuit (chip) that simulates the activities, mechanics and physiological response of an entire organ or an organ system. It constitutes the subject matter of significant biomedical engineering research, more precisely in bio-MEMS. The convergence of labs-on-chips (LOCs) and cell biology has permitted the study of human physiology in an organ-specific context. By acting as a more sophisticated in vitro approximation of complex tissues than standard cell culture, they provide the potential as an alternative to animal models for drug development and toxin testing.

Although multiple publications claim to have translated organ functions onto this interface, the development of these microfluidic applications is still in its infancy. Organs-on-chips vary in design and approach between different researchers. Organs that have been simulated by microfluidic devices include brain, lung, heart, kidney, liver, prostate, vessel (artery), skin, bone, cartilage and more.

A limitation of the early organ-on-a-chip approach is that simulation of an isolated organ may miss significant biological phenomena that occur in the body's complex network of physiological processes, and that this oversimplification limits the inferences that can be drawn. Many aspects of subsequent microphysiometry aim to address these constraints by modeling more sophisticated physiological responses under accurately simulated conditions via microfabrication, microelectronics and microfluidics.

The development of organ chips has enabled the study of the complex pathophysiology of human viral infections. An example is the liver chip platform that has enabled studies of viral hepatitis. Recent work has highlighted the use of organ-on-a-chip systems for modelling aging processes and age-related diseases, including neurodegeneration, cardiovascular dysfunction, and skin aging.

== Lab-on-chip ==
A lab-on-a-chip is a device that integrates one or several laboratory functions on a single chip that deals with handling particles in hollow microfluidic channels. It has been developed for over a decade. Advantages in handling particles at such a small scale include lowering fluid volume consumption (lower reagents costs, less waste), increasing portability of the devices, increasing process control (due to quicker thermo-chemical reactions) and decreasing fabrication costs. Additionally, microfluidic flow is entirely laminar (i.e., no turbulence). Consequently, there is virtually no mixing between neighboring streams in one hollow channel. In cellular biology convergence, this rare property in fluids has been leveraged to better study complex cell behaviors, such as cell motility in response to chemotactic stimuli, stem cell differentiation, axon guidance, subcellular propagation of biochemical signaling and embryonic development.

== Transitioning from 3D cell-culture models to OOCs ==
3D cell-culture models exceed 2D culture systems by promoting higher levels of cell differentiation and tissue organization. 3D culture systems are more successful because the flexibility of the ECM gels accommodates shape changes and cell-cell connections – formerly prohibited by rigid 2D culture substrates. The most widely used 3D cell culture models include spheroids and organoids. Nevertheless, even the best 3D culture models fail to mimic an organ's cellular properties in many aspects, including tissue-to-tissue interfaces (e.g., epithelium and vascular endothelium), spatiotemporal gradients of chemicals, and the mechanically active microenvironments (e.g. arteries' vasoconstriction and vasodilator responses to temperature differentials). The application of microfluidics in organs-on-chips enables the efficient transport and distribution of nutrients and other soluble cues throughout the viable 3D tissue constructs. Organs-on-chips are referred to as the next wave of 3D cell-culture models that mimic whole living organs' biological activities, dynamic mechanical properties and biochemical functionalities.

== Organs ==
=== Brain ===
Brain-on-a-chip devices are devices that allow the culturing and manipulation of brain-related tissues through microfabrication and microfluidics by: 1) improving culture viability; 2) supporting high-throughput screening for simple models; 3) modeling tissue or organ-level physiology and disease in vitro/ex vivo, and 4) adding high precision and tunability of microfluidic devices. Brain-on-a-chip devices can span multiple levels of complexity in terms of cell culture methodology and can include brain parenchyma and/or blood-brain barrier tissues. Devices have been made using platforms that range from traditional 2D cell culture to 3D tissues in the form of organotypic brain slices and more recently organoids.

Organotypic brain slices are an in vitro model that replicates in vivo physiology with additional throughput and optical benefits, thus pairing well with microfluidic devices. Brain slices have advantages over primary cell culture in that tissue architecture is preserved and multicellular interactions can still occur. There is flexibility in their use, as slices can be used acutely (less than 6 hours after slice harvesting) or cultured for later experimental use. Because organotypic brain slices can maintain viability for weeks, they allow for long-term effects to be studied. Slice-based systems also provide experimental access with precise control of extracellular environments, making it a suitable platform for correlating disease with neuropathological outcomes. Organotypic brain slices can be extracted and cultured from multiple animal species (e.g. rats), but also from humans.

Microfluidic devices have been paired with organotypic slices to improve culture viability. The standard procedure for culturing organotypic brain slices (around 300 microns in thickness) uses semi-porous membranes to create an air-medium interface, but this technique results in diffusion limitations of nutrients and dissolved gases. Because microfluidic systems introduce laminar flow of these necessary nutrients and gases, transport is improved and higher tissue viability can be achieved. In addition to keeping standard slices viable, brain-on-a-chip platforms have allowed the successful culturing of thicker brain slices (approximately 700 microns), despite a significant transport barrier due to thickness. As thicker slices retain more native tissue architecture, this allows brain-on-a-chip devices to achieve more "in vivo-like" characteristics without sacrificing cell viability. Microfluidic devices support high-throughput screening and toxicological assessments in both 2D and slice cultures, leading to the development of novel therapeutics targeted for the brain. One device was able to screen the drugs pitavastatin and irinotecan combinatorically in glioblastoma multiform (the most common form of human brain cancer). These screening approaches have been combined with the modeling of the blood-brain barrier (BBB), a significant hurdle for drugs to overcome when treating the brain, allowing for drug efficacy across this barrier to be studied in vitro. Microfluidic probes have been used to deliver dyes with high regional precision, making way for localized microperfusion in drug applications. Microfluidic BBB in vitro models replicate a 3D environment for embedded cells (which provides precise control of cellular and extracellular environment), replicate shear stress, have more physiologically relevant morphology in comparison to 2D models, and provide easy incorporation of different cell types into the device. Because microfluidic devices can be designed with optical accessibility, this also allows for the visualization of morphology and processes in specific regions or individual cells. Brain-on-a-chip systems can model organ-level physiology in neurological diseases, such as Alzheimer's disease, Parkinson's disease, and multiple sclerosis more accurately than with traditional 2D and 3D cell culture techniques. The ability to model these diseases in a way that is indicative of in vivo conditions is essential for the translation of therapies and treatments. Additionally, brain-on-a-chip devices have been used for medical diagnostics, such as in biomarker detection for cancer in brain tissue slices.

Brain-on-a-chip devices can cause shear stress on cells or tissue due to flow through small channels, which can result in cellular damage. These small channels also introduce susceptibility to the trapping of air bubbles that can disrupt flow and potentially cause damage to the cells. The widespread use of PDMS (polydimethylsiloxane) in brain-on-a-chip devices has some drawbacks. Although PDMS is cheap, malleable, and transparent, proteins and small molecules can be absorbed by it and later leech at uncontrolled rates.

Despite the progress in microfluidic BBB devices, these devices are often too technically complex, require highly specialized setups and equipment, and are unable to detect temporal and spatial differences in the transport kinetics of substances that migrate across cellular barriers. Also, direct measurements of permeability in these models are limited due to the limited perfusion and complex, poorly defined geometry of the newly formed microvascular network.

=== Gut ===
The human gut-on-a-chip contains two microchannels that are separated by the flexible porous Extracellular Matrix (ECM)-coated membrane lined by the gut epithelial cells: Caco-2, which has been used extensively as the intestinal barrier. Caco-2 cells are cultured under spontaneous differentiation of its parental cell, a human colon adenocarcinoma, that represent the model of protective and absorptive properties of the gut. The microchannels are fabricated from polydimethylsiloxane (PDMS) polymer. In order to mimic the gut microenvironment, peristalsis-like fluid flow is designed. By inducing suction in the vacuum chambers along both sides of the main cell channel bilayer, cyclic mechanical strain of stretching and relaxing are developed to mimic the gut behaviors. Furthermore, cells undergo spontaneous villus morphogenesis and differentiation, which generalizes characteristics of intestinal cells. Under the three-dimensional villi scaffold, cells not only proliferate, but metabolic activities are also enhanced. Another important player in the gut is the microbes, namely gut microbiota. Many microbial species in the gut microbiota are strict anaerobes. In order to co-culture these oxygen intolerant anaerobes with the oxygen favorable intestinal cells, a polysulfone fabricated gut-on-a-chip is designed. The system maintained the co-culture of colon epithelial cells, goblet-like cells, and bacteria Faecalibacterium prausnitzii, Eubacterium rectale, and Bacteroides thetaiotaomicron.

Oral administration is one of the most common methods for drug administration. It allows patients, especially out-patients, to self-serve the drugs with minimal possibility of experiencing acute drug reactions and in most cases: pain-free. However, the drug's action in the body can be largely influenced by the first pass effect. The gut, which plays an important role in the human digestive system, determines the effectiveness of a drug by absorbing its chemical and biological properties selectively. While it is costly and time-consuming to develop new drugs, the fact that the gut-on-a-chip technology attains a high level of throughput has significantly decreased research and development costs and time for new drugs.

Even though the cause for inflammatory bowel disease (IBD) is elusive, its pathophysiology involves the gut microbiota. Current methods of inducing IBD are using inflammatory cues to activate Caco-2. It was found that the intestinal epithelium experienced a reduction in barrier function and increased cytokine concentrations. The gut-on-a-chip allowed for the assessment on drug transport, absorption and toxicity as well as potential developments in studying pathogenesis and interactions in the microenvironment overall. Immune cells are essential in mediating inflammatory processes in many gastrointestinal disorders, a recent gut-on-a-chip system also includes multiple immune cells, e.g., macrophages, dendritic cells, and CD4+ T cells in the system. Additionally, the gut-on-a-chip allows the testing of anti-inflammatory effects of bacterial species.

The chip was used to model human radiation-induced injury to the intestine in vitro as it recapitulated the injuries at both cellular and tissue levels. Injuries include but not limited to: inhabitation of mucus production, promotion of villus blunting, and distortion of microvilli.

=== Lung ===
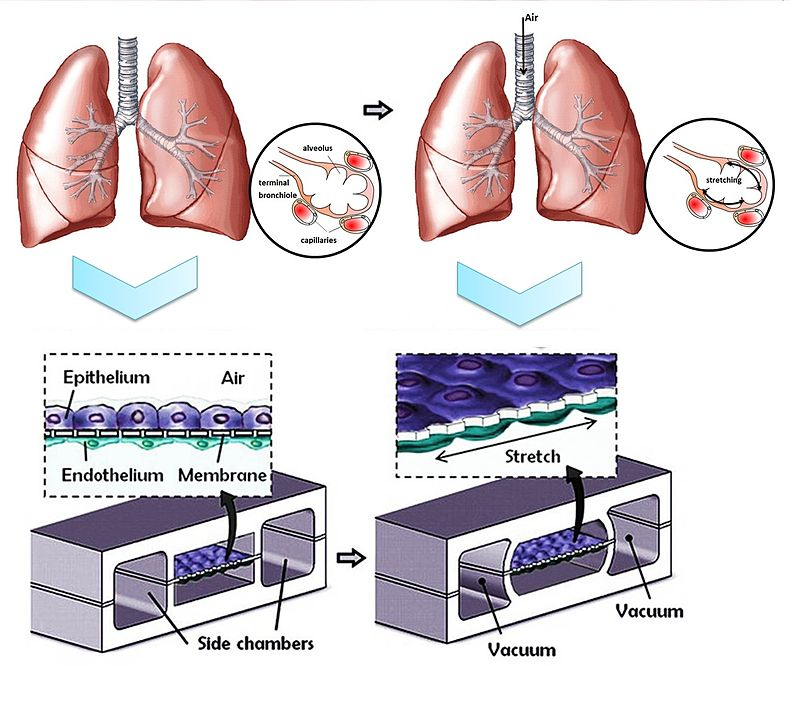
Schematic drawing of a lung-on-a-chip. The membrane in the middle can be stretched by vacuum in the two side chambers.

Lung-on-a-chips are being designed in an effort to improve the physiological relevance of existing in vitro alveolar-capillary interface models. Such a multifunctional microdevice can reproduce key structural, functional and mechanical properties of the human alveolar-capillary interface (i.e., the fundamental functional unit of the living lung).

Dongeun Huh from Wyss Institute for Biologically Inspired Engineering at Harvard describes their fabrication of a system containing two closely apposed microchannels separated by a thin (10 μm) porous flexible membrane made of PDMS. The device largely comprises three microfluidic channels, and only the middle one holds the porous membrane. Culture cells were grown on either side of the membrane: human alveolar epithelial cells on one side, and human pulmonary microvascular endothelial cells on the other.

The compartmentalization of the channels facilitates not only the flow of air as a fluid which delivers cells and nutrients to the apical surface of the epithelium, but also allows for pressure differences to exist between the middle and side channels. During normal inspiration in a human's respiratory cycle, intrapleural pressure decreases, triggering an expansion of the alveoli. As air is pulled into the lungs, alveolar epithelium and the coupled endothelium in the capillaries are stretched. Since a vacuum is connected to the side channels, a decrease in pressure will cause the middle channel to expand, thus stretching the porous membrane and subsequently, the entire alveolar-capillary interface. The pressure-driven dynamic motion behind the stretching of the membrane, also described as a cyclic mechanical strain (valued at approximately 10%), significantly increases the rate of nanoparticle translocation across the porous membrane, when compared to a static version of this device, and to a Transwell culture system.

In order to fully validate the biological accuracy of a device, its whole-organ responses must be evaluated. In this instance, researchers inflicted injuries to the cells:

- Pulmonary inflammation: Pulmonary inflammatory responses entail a multistep strategy, but alongside an increased production of epithelial cells and an early response release of cytokines, the interface should undergo an increased number of leukocyte adhesion molecules. In Huh's experiment, the pulmonary inflammation was simulated by introducing medium containing a potent proinflammatory mediator. Only hours after the injury was caused, the cells in the microfluidic device subjected to a cyclic strain reacted in accordance with the previously mentioned biological response.
- Pulmonary infection: Living E-coli bacteria was used to demonstrate how the system can even mimic the innate cellular response to a bacterial pulmonary infection. The bacteria were introduced onto the apical surface of the alveolar epithelium. Within hours, neutrophils were detected in the alveolar compartment, meaning they had transmigrated from the vascular microchannel where the porous membrane had phagocytized the bacteria.

Additionally, researchers believe the potential value of this lung-on-a-chip system will aid in toxicology applications. By investigating the pulmonary response to nanoparticles, researchers hope to learn more about health risks in certain environments, and correct previously oversimplified in vitro models. Because a microfluidic lung-on-a-chip can more exactly reproduce the mechanical properties of a living human lung, its physiological responses will be quicker and more accurate than a Transwell culture system. Nevertheless, published studies admit that responses of a lung-on-a-chip do not yet fully reproduce the responses of native alveolar epithelial cells.

=== Heart ===
Past efforts to replicate in vivo cardiac tissue environments have proven to be challenging due to difficulties when mimicking contractility and electrophysiological responses. Such features would greatly increase the accuracy of in vitro experiments.

Microfluidics has already contributed to in vitro experiments on cardiomyocytes, which generate the electrical impulses that control the heart rate. For instance, researchers have built an array of PDMS microchambers, aligned with sensors and stimulating electrodes as a tool that will electrochemically and optically monitor the cardiomyocytes' metabolism. Another lab-on-a-chip similarly combined a microfluidic network in PDMS with planar microelectrodes, this time to measure extracellular potentials from single adult murine cardiomyocytes.

A reported design of a heart-on-a-chip claims to have built "an efficient means of measuring structure-function relationships in constructs that replicate the hierarchical tissue architectures of laminar cardiac muscle." This chip determines that the alignment of the myocytes in the contractile apparatus made of cardiac tissue and the gene expression profile (affected by shape and cell structure deformation) contributes to the force produced in cardiac contractility. This heart-on-a-chip is a biohybrid construct: an engineered anisotropic ventricular myocardium is an elastomeric thin film.

The design and fabrication process of this particular microfluidic device entails first covering the edges of a glass surface with tape (or any protective film) such as to contour the substrate's desired shape. A spin coat layer of PNIPA is then applied. After its dissolution, the protective film is peeled away, resulting in a self-standing body of PNIPA. The final steps involve the spin coating of protective surface of PDMS over the cover slip and curing. Muscular thin films (MTF) enable cardiac muscle monolayers to be engineered on a thin flexible substrate of PDMS. In order to properly seed the 2D cell culture, a microcontact printing technique was used to lay out a fibronectin "brick wall" pattern on the PDMS surface. Once the ventricular myocytes were seeded on the functionalized substrate, the fibronectin pattern oriented them to generate an anisotropic monolayer.

After the cutting of the thin films into two rows with rectangular teeth, and subsequent placement of the whole device in a bath, electrodes stimulate the contraction of the myocytes via a field-stimulation – thus curving the strips/teeth in the MTF. Researchers have developed a correlation between tissue stress and the radius of curvature of the MTF strips during the contractile cycle, validating the demonstrated chip as a "platform for quantification of stress, electrophysiology and cellular architecture."

While researchers have focused on 2D cell cultures, 3D cell constructs mimic the in vivo environment and the interactions (e.g., cell to cell) occurring in the human body better. Hence, they are considered promising models for studies such as toxicology and response to drugs. Based on the study of Chen et al., the interactions of valvular endothelial/interstitial cells (VECs/VICs) are studied via a 3D PDMS-glass microfluidic device with a top channel flowed with VECs under shear stress, a membrane with uniform pores, and a bottom channel containing VIC-hydrogel. VECs are verified to restrain the differentiation of morbid VIC myofibroblast, with reinforced suppression by shear stress.

Another PDMS 3D microfluidic heart-on-a-chip design is measured to generate 10% to 15% of uniaxial cyclic mechanical strains. The device consists of a cell culture with hanging posts for caging and an actuation compartment with scaffolding posts to avoid buckling of PDMS, along with the cardiac cycle pressure signal imitation. The neonatal rat micro-engineered cardiac tissues (μECTs) stimulated by this design show improved synchronous beating, proliferation, maturation, and viability compared to the unstimulated control. The contraction rate of human induced pluripotent stem cell-derived cardiomyocytes (hiPSC-CM) is observed to accelerate with 100-fold less isoprenaline, a heart block treatment, when having electrical pacing signal (+ES) compared to that without ES.

3D microfluidic heart-on-a-chips have also facilitated the research of heart diseases. For instance, cardiac hypertrophy and fibrosis are studied via the respective biomarker level of the mechanically stimulated μECTs, such as atrial natriuretic peptide (ANP) for the former and transforming growth factor-β (TGF-β) for the latter. Also, the knowledge of ischaemia is gained by action potential observations.

Rapid dissemination and availability of low cost, high resolution 3D printing technology provided possibilities for building patient specific heart and cardiovascular systems. The confluence of high resolution 3D printing, patient derived iPSCs with artificial intelligence is posed to make strides towards personalized heart modelling and ultimately, patient care.

=== Kidney ===
Renal cells and nephrons have already been simulated by microfluidic devices. "Such cell cultures can lead to new insights into cell and organ function and be used for drug screening". A kidney-on-a-chip device has the potential to accelerate research encompassing artificial replacement for lost kidney function. Nowadays, dialysis requires patients to go to a clinic up to three times per week. A more transportable and accessible form of treatment would not only increase the patient's overall health (by increasing frequency of treatment), but the whole process would become more efficient and tolerable. Artificial kidney research is striving to bring transportability, wearability and perhaps implantation capability to the devices through innovative disciplines: microfluidics, miniaturization and nanotechnology.

The nephron is the functional unit of the kidney and is composed of a glomerulus and a tubular component. Researchers at MIT claim to have designed a bioartificial device that replicates the function of the nephron's glomerulus, proximal convoluted tubule and loop of Henle.

Each part of the device has its unique design, generally consisting of two microfabricated layers separated by a membrane. The only inlet to the microfluidic device is designed for the entering blood sample. In the glomerulus' section of the nephron, the membrane allows certain blood particles through its wall of capillary cells, composed by the endothelium, basement membrane and the epithelial podocytes. The fluid that is filtered from the capillary blood into Bowman's space is called filtrate or primary urine.

In the tubules, some substances are added to the filtrate as part of the urine formation, and some substances reabsorbed out of the filtrate and back into the blood. The first segment of these tubules is the proximal convoluted tubule. This is where the almost complete absorption of nutritionally important substances takes place. In the device, this section is merely a straight channel, but blood particles going to the filtrate have to cross the previously mentioned membrane and a layer of renal proximal tubule cells. The second segment of the tubules is the loop of Henle where the reabsorption of water and ions from the urine takes place. The device's looping channels strives to simulate the countercurrent mechanism of the loop of Henle. Likewise, the loop of Henle requires a number of different cell types because each cell type has distinct transport properties and characteristics. These include the descending limb cells, thin ascending limb cells, thick ascending limb cells, cortical collecting duct cells and medullary collecting duct cells.

One step towards validating the microfluidic device's simulation of the full filtration and reabsorption behavior of a physiological nephron would include demonstrating that the transport properties between blood and filtrate are identical with regards to where they occur and what is being let in by the membrane. For example, the large majority of passive transport of water occurs in the proximal tubule and the descending thin limb, or the active transport of NaCl largely occurs in the proximal tubule and the thick ascending limb. The device's design requirements would require the filtration fraction in the glomerulus to vary between 15 and 20%, or the filtration reabsorption in the proximal convoluted tubule to vary between 65 and 70%, and finally the urea concentration in urine (collected at one of the two outlets of the device) to vary between 200 and 400 mM.

One recent report illustrates a biomimic nephron on hydrogel microfluidic devices with establishing the function of passive diffusion. The complex physiological function of nephron is achieved on the basis of interactions between vessels and tubules (both are hollow channels). However, conventional laboratory techniques usually focus on 2D structures, such as petri-dish that lacks capability to recapitulate real physiology that occurs in 3D. Therefore, the authors developed a new method to fabricate functional, cell-lining and perfusable microchannels inside 3D hydrogel. The vessel endothelial and renal epithelial cells are cultured inside hydrogel microchannel and form cellular coverage to mimic vessels and tubules, respectively. They employed confocal microscope to examine the passive diffusion of one small organic molecule (usually drugs) between the vessels and tubules in hydrogel. The study demonstrates the beneficial potential to mimic renal physiology for regenerative medicine and drug screening.

=== Liver ===
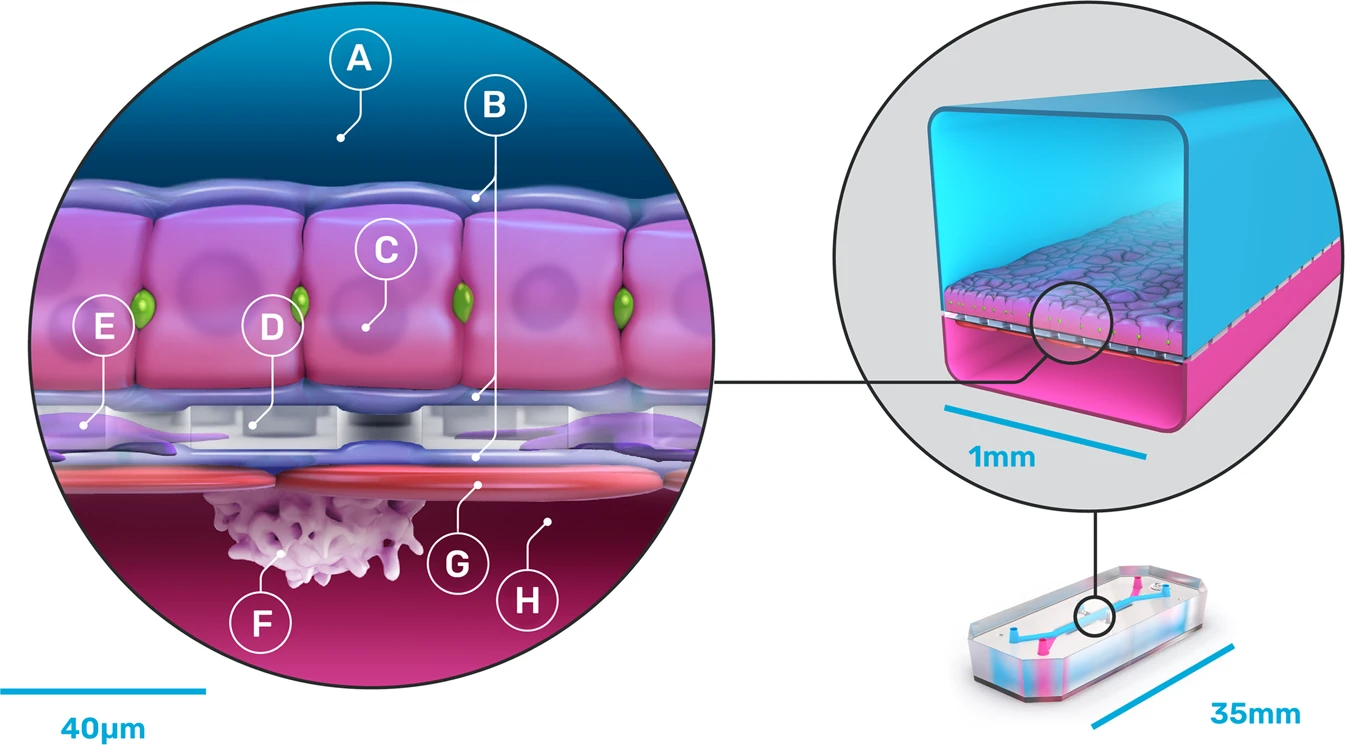
Schematic of a liver-chip

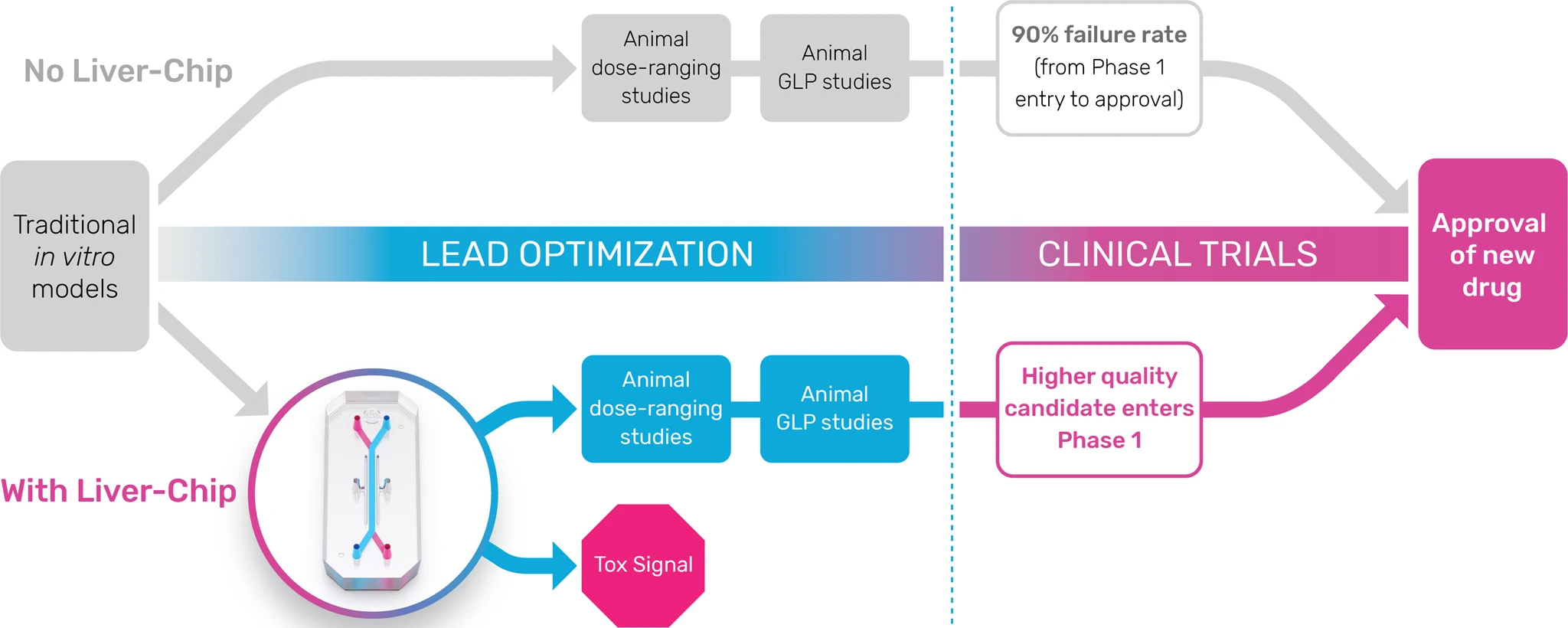
Proposed positioning of the Liver-Chip within a typical pharma preclinical workflow

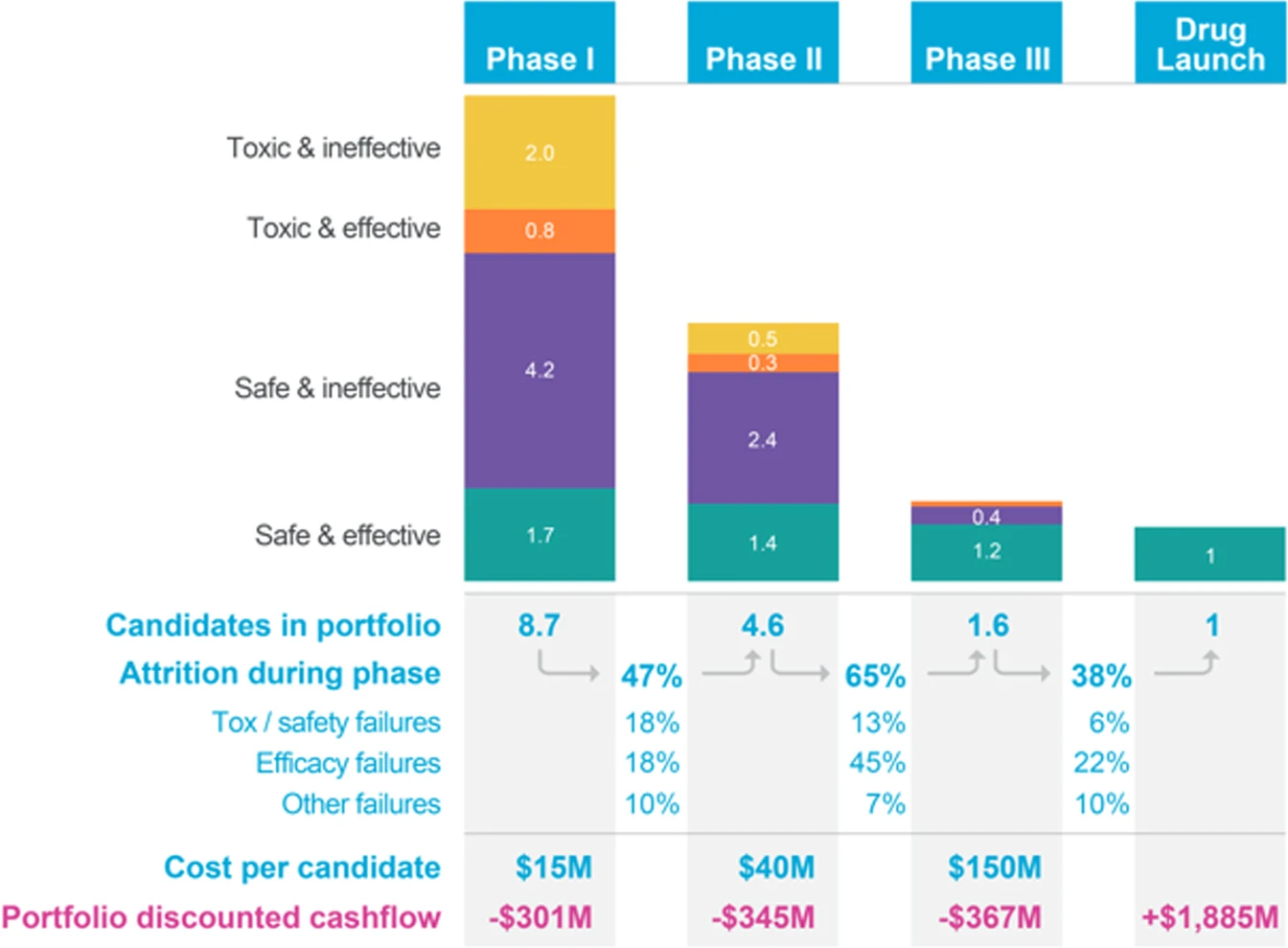
Potential financial impact of improved preclinical testing with liver-chips according to one study

The liver is a major organ of metabolism, and it is related to glycogen storage, decomposition of red blood cells, certain protein and hormone synthesis, and detoxification. Within these functions, its detoxification response is essential for new drug development and clinical trials. In addition, because of its multi-functions, the liver is prone to many diseases, and liver diseases have become a global challenge.

Liver-on-a-chip devices utilize microfluidic techniques to simulate the hepatic system by imitating complex hepatic lobules that involve liver functions. Liver-on-a-chip devices provide a good model to help researchers work on dysfunction and pathogenesis of the liver with relatively low cost. Researchers use primary rat hepatocytes and other nonparenchymal cells. This coculture method is extensively studied and is proved to be beneficial for extension of hepatocytes survival time and support the performance of liver-specific functions. Many liver-on-a-chip systems are made of poly(dimethylsiloxane) (PDMS) with multiple channels and chambers based on specific design and objective. PDMS is used and has become popular because it has relatively low price for raw materials, and it is also easily molded for microfluidic devices. But PDMS can absorb important signaling molecules including proteins and hormones. Other more inert materials such as polysulfone or polycarbonate are used in liver-chips.

A study by Emulate researchers assessed advantages of using liver-chips predicting drug-induced liver injury which could reduce the high costs and time needed in drug development workflows/pipelines, sometimes described as the pharmaceutical industry's "productivity crisis". Zaher Nahle subsequently outlined 12 "reasons why micro-physiological systems (MPS) like organ-chips are better at modeling human diseases".

One design from Kane et al. cocultures primary rat hepatocytes and 3T3-J2 fibroblasts in an 8*8 element array of microfluidic wells. Each well is separated into two chambers. The primary chamber contains rat hepatocytes and 3T3-J2 fibroblasts and is made of glass for cells adhesion. Each of primary chamber is connected to a microfluidic network that supply metabolic substrate and remove metabolic byproducts. A 100 μm thick membrane of PDMS separates the primary and secondary chamber, allowing the secondary chamber to be connected to another microfluidic network that perfuses 37 °C room air with 10% carbon dioxide, and producing air exchange for rat hepatocytes. The production of urea and steady-state protein proves the viability of this device for use in high-throughput toxicity studies.

Another design from Kang et al. cocultures primary rat hepatocytes and endothelial cells. A single-channel is made first. Hepatocytes and endothelial cells are then planted on the device and are separated by a thin Matrigel layer in between. The metabolic substrate and metabolic byproducts share this channel to be supplied or removed. Later, a dual-channel is made, and endothelial cells and hepatocytes cells have their own channels to supply the substrate or remove the byproduct. The production of urea and positive result on hepatitis B virus (HBV) replication test shows its potential to study hepatotropic viruses.

There are a few other applications on liver-on-a-chip. Lu et al. developed a liver tumor-on-a-chip model. The decellularized liver matrix (DLM)-gelatin methacryloyl (GelMA)-based biomimetic liver tumor-on-a-chip proved to be a suitable design for further anti-tumor studies. Zhou et al. analyzed alcohol injures on the hepatocytes and the signaling and recovery. It has also been possible to develop co-culture chips that can be used to study metabolic interactions.

The liver-on-a-chip has been used in liver-related research, including studies of liver function, drug metabolism, and toxicity. Future development of liver-on-a-chip devices aims to more closely reproduce the physiological environment of the liver, including its fluid composition, diverse cell types, and long-term cell viability.

=== Prostate ===
Recreation of the prostate epithelium is motivated by evidence suggesting it to be the site of nucleation in cancer metastasis. These systems essentially serve as the next step in the development of cells cultured from mice to two and subsequently three-dimensional human cell culturing. PDMS developments have enabled the creation of microfluidic systems that offer the benefit of adjustable topography, gas and liquid exchange, as well as an ease of observation via conventional microscopy.

Researchers at the University of Grenoble Alpes have outlined a methodology that utilizes such a microfluidic system in the attempt to construct a viable Prostate epithelium model. The approach focuses on a cylindrical microchannel configuration, mimicking the morphology of a human secretory duct, within which the epithelium is located. Various microchannel diameters were assessed for successful promotion of cell cultures, and it was observed that diameters of 150-400 μm were the most successful. Furthermore, cellular adhesion endured throughout this experimentation, despite the introduction of physical stress through variations in microfluidic currents.

The objective of these constructions is to facilitate the collection of prostatic fluid, along with gauging cellular reactions to microenvironmental changes. Additionally, prostate-on-a-chip enables the recreation of metastasis scenarios, which allows the assessment of drug candidates and other therapeutic approaches. Scalability of this method is also attractive to researchers, as the reusable mold approach ensures a low-cost of production.

=== Blood vessel ===
Cardiovascular diseases are often caused by changes in structure and function of small blood vessels. For instance, self-reported rates of hypertension suggest that the rate is increasing, says a 2003 report from the National Health and Nutrition Examination Survey. A microfluidic platform simulating the biological response of an artery could not only enable organ-based screens to occur more frequently throughout a drug development trial, but also yield a comprehensive understanding of the underlying mechanisms behind pathologic changes in small arteries and develop better treatment strategies. Axel Gunther from the University of Toronto argues that such MEMS-based devices could potentially help in the assessment of a patient's microvascular status in a clinical setting (personalized medicine).

Conventional methods used to examine intrinsic properties of isolated resistance vessels (arterioles and small arteries with diameters varying between 30 μm and 300 μm) include the pressure myography technique. However, such methods currently require manually skilled personnel and are not scalable. An artery-on-a-chip could overcome several of these limitations by accommodating an artery onto a platform which would be scalable, inexpensive and possibly automated in its manufacturing.

An organ-based microfluidic platform has been developed as a lab-on-a-chip onto which a fragile blood vessel can be fixed, allowing for determinants of resistance artery malfunctions to be studied.

The artery microenvironment is characterized by surrounding temperature, transmural pressure, and luminal & abluminal drug concentrations. The multiple inputs from a microenvironment cause a wide range of mechanical or chemical stimuli on the smooth muscle cells (SMCs) and endothelial cells (ECs) that line the vessel's outer and luminal walls, respectively. Endothelial cells are responsible for releasing vasoconstriction and vasodilator factors, thus modifying tone. Vascular tone is defined as the degree of constriction inside a blood vessel relative to its maximum diameter. Pathogenic concepts currently believe that subtle changes to this microenvironment have pronounced effects on arterial tone and can severely alter peripheral vascular resistance. The engineers behind this design believe that a specific strength lies in its ability to control and simulate heterogeneous spatiotemporal influences found within the microenvironment, whereas myography protocols have, by virtue of their design, only established homogeneous microenvironments. They proved that by delivering phenylephrine through only one of the two channels providing superfusion to the outer walls, the drug-facing side constricted much more than the drug opposing side.

The artery-on-a-chip is designed for reversible implantation of the sample. The device contains a microchannel network, an artery loading area and a separate artery inspection area. There is a microchannel used for loading the artery segment, and when the loading well is sealed, it is also used as a perfusion channel, to replicate the process of nutritive delivery of arterial blood to a capillary bed in the biological tissue. Another pair of microchannels serves to fix the two ends of the arterial segment. Finally, the last pair of microchannels is used to provide superfusion flow rates, in order to maintain the physiological and metabolic activity of the organ by delivering a constant sustaining medium over the abluminal wall. A thermoelectric heater and a thermoresistor are connected to the chip and maintain physiological temperatures at the artery inspection area.

The protocol of loading and securing the tissue sample into the inspection zone helps understand how this approach acknowledges whole organ functions. After immersing the tissue segment into the loading well, the loading process is driven by a syringe withdrawing a constant flow rate of buffer solution at the far end of the loading channel. This causes the transport of the artery towards its dedicated position. This is done with closed fixation and superfusion in/outlet lines. After stopping the pump, sub-atmospheric pressure is applied through one of the fixation channels. Then after sealing the loading well shut, the second fixation channel is subjected to a sub-atmospheric pressure. Now the artery is symmetrically established in the inspection area, and a transmural pressure is felt by the segment. The remaining channels are opened and constant perfusion and superfusion are adjusted using separate syringe pumps.

Vessel-on-chips have been applied to study many disease processes. For example, Alireza Mashaghi and his co-workers developed a model to study viral hemorrhagic syndrome, which involves virus induced vascular integrity loss. The model was used to study Ebola virus disease and to study anti-Ebola drugs. In 2021, the approach has been adapted to model Lassa fever and to show the therapeutic effects of peptide FX-06 for Lassa virus disease.

=== Skin ===
Human skin is the first line of defense against many pathogens and can itself be subject to a variety of diseases and issues, such as cancers and inflammation. As such, skin-on-a-chip (SoC) applications include testing of topical pharmaceuticals and cosmetics, studying the pathology of skin diseases and inflammation, and "creating noninvasive automated cellular assays" to test for the presence of antigens or antibodies that could denote the presence of a pathogen. Despite the wide variety of potential applications, relatively little research has gone into developing a skin-on-a-chip compared to many other organ-on-a-chips, such as lungs and kidneys. Issues such as detachment of the collagen scaffolding from microchannels, incomplete cellular differentiation, and predominant use of poly(dimethysiloxane) (PDMS) for device fabrication, which has been shown to leach chemicals into biological samples and cannot be mass-produced stymie standardization of a platform. One additional difficulty is the variability of cell-culture scaffolding, or the base substance in which to culture cells, that is used in skin-on-chip devices. In the human body, this substance is known as the extracellular matrix.

The extracellular matrix (ECM) is composed primarily of collagen, and various collagen-based scaffolding has been tested in SoC models. Collagen tends to detach from the microfluidic backbone during culturing due to the contraction of fibroblasts. One study attempted to address this problem by comparing the qualities of collagen scaffolding from three different animal sources: pig skin, rat tail, and duck feet. Other studies also faced detachment issues due to contraction, which can problematic considering that the process of full skin differentiation can take up to several weeks. Contraction issues have been avoided by replacing collagen scaffolding with a fibrin-based dermal matrix, which did not contract. Greater differentiation and formation of cell layers was also reported in microfluidic culture when compared to traditional static culture, agreeing with earlier findings of improved cell-cell and cell-matrix interactions due to dynamic perfusion, or increased permeation through interstitial spaces due to the pressure from continuous media flow. This improved differentiation and growth is thought to be in part a product of shear stress created by the pressure gradient along a microchannel due to fluid flow, which may also improve nutrient supply to cells not directly adjacent to the medium. In static cultures, used in traditional skin equivalents, cells receive nutrients in the medium only through diffusion, whereas dynamic perfusion can improve nutrient flow through interstitial spaces, or gaps between cells. This perfusion has also been demonstrated to improve tight junction formation of the stratum corneum, the tough outer layer of the epidermis, which is the main barrier to penetration of the surface layer of the skin.

Dynamic perfusion may also improve cell viability, demonstrated by placing a commercial skin equivalent in a microfluidic platform that extended the expected lifespan by several weeks. This early study also demonstrated the importance of hair follicles in skin equivalent models. Hair follicles are the primary route into the subcutaneous layer for topical creams and other substances applied to the surface of the skin, a feature that more recent studies have often not accounted for.

One study developed a SoC consisting of three layers, the epidermis, dermis, and endothelial layer, separated by porous membranes, to study edema, swelling due to extracellular fluid accumulation, a common response to infection or injury and an essential step for cellular repair. It was demonstrated that pre-application of Dex, a steroidal cream with anti-inflammatory properties, reduced this swelling in the SoC.

=== Endometrium ===
The endometrium has been modeled for its role in implantation and other stages of pregnancy.

== Human-on-a-chip ==
Researchers are working towards building a multi-channel 3D microfluidic cell culture system that compartmentalizes microenvironments in which 3D cellular aggregates are cultured to mimic multiple organs in the body. Most organ-on-a-chip models today only culture one cell type, so even though they may be valid models for studying whole organ functions, the systemic effect of a drug on the human body is not verified.

In particular, an integrated cell culture analog (μCCA) was developed and included lung cells, drug-metabolizing liver and fat cells. The cells were linked in a 2D fluidic network with culture medium circulating as a blood surrogate, thus efficiently providing a nutritional delivery transport system, while simultaneously removing wastes from the cells. "The development of the μCCA laid the foundation for a realistic in vitro pharmacokinetic model and provided an integrated biomimetic system for culturing multiple cell types with high fidelity to in vivo situations", claim C. Zhang et al. They have developed a microfluidic human-on-a-chip, culturing four different cell types to mimic four human organs: liver, lung, kidney and fat. They focused on developing a standard serum-free culture media that would be valuable to all cell types included in the device. Optimized standard media are generally targeted to one specific cell-type, whereas a human-on-a-chip will evidently require a common medium (CM). In fact, they claim to have identified a cell culture CM that, when used to perfuse all cell cultures in the microfluidic device, maintains the cells' functional levels. Heightening the sensitivity of the in vitro cultured cells ensures the validity of the device, or that any drug injected into the microchannels will stimulate an identical physiological and metabolic reaction from the sample cells as whole organs in humans.

A human-on-a-chip design that allows tuning microfluidic transport to multiple tissues using a single fluidic actuator was designed and evaluated for modelling prediabetic hyperglycaemia using liver and pancreatic tissues.

With more extensive development of these kinds of chips, pharmaceutical companies will potentially be able to measure direct effects of one organ's reaction on another. For instance, the delivery of biochemical substances would be screened to confirm that even though it may benefit one cell type, it does not compromise the functions of others. It is probably already possible to print these organs with 3D printers, but the cost is too high. Designing whole body biomimetic devices addresses a major reservation that pharmaceutical companies have towards organs-on-chips, namely the isolation of organs. As these devices become more and more accessible, the complexity of the design increases exponentially. Systems will soon have to simultaneously provide mechanical perturbation and fluid flow through a circulatory system. "Anything that requires dynamic control rather than just static control is a challenge", says Takayama from the University of Michigan. This challenge has been partially tackled by tissue engineering Linda Griffith group from MIT. A complex multi-organ-on-a-chip was developed to have 4, 7, or 10 organs interconnected through fluidic control. The system is able to maintain the function of these organs for weeks.

== Replacing animal testing ==
In the early phase of drug development, animal models were the only way of obtaining in vivo data that would predict the human pharmacokinetic responses. However, experiments on animals are lengthy, expensive and controversial. For example, animal models are often subjected to mechanical or chemical techniques that simulate human injuries. There are also concerns with regards to the validity of such animal models, due to deficiency in cross-species extrapolation. Moreover, animal models offer very limited control of individual variables and it can be cumbersome to harvest specific information. Therefore, the U.S. Food and Drug Administration (FDA) announced its intent in April 2025 to phase out mandatory animal testing requirements for certain drug classes, signalling a broader regulatory acceptance of new approach methodologies. These methodologies range from microphysiological systems, also known as organ-on-a-chip, to artificial intelligence (AI)-based modelling with intention to accelerate preclinical development.

Therefore, mimicking a human's physiological responses in an in vitro model needs to be made more affordable, and needs to offer cellular level control in biological experiments: biomimetic microfluidic systems could replace animal testing. The development of MEMS-based biochips that reproduce complex organ-level pathological responses could revolutionize many fields, including toxicology and the developmental process of pharmaceuticals and cosmetics that rely on animal testing and clinical trials.

Recently, physiologically based perfusion in vitro systems have been developed to provide cell culture environment close to in vivo cell environment. A new testing platforms based on multi-compartmental perfused systems have gained a remarkable interest in pharmacology and toxicology. It aims to provide a cell culture environment close to the in vivo situation to reproduce more reliably in vivo mechanisms or ADME processes that involve its absorption, distribution, metabolism, and elimination. Perfused in vitro systems combined with kinetic modelling are promising tools for studying in vitro the different processes involved in the toxicokinetics of xenobiotics.

Efforts made toward the development of micro fabricated cell culture systems that aim to create models that replicate aspects of the human body as closely as possible and give examples that demonstrate their potential use in drug development, such as identifying synergistic drug interactions as well as simulating multi-organ metabolic interactions. Multi compartment micro fluidic-based devices, particularly those that are physical representations of physiologically based pharmacokinetic (PBPK) models that represent the mass transfer of compounds in compartmental models of the mammalian body, may contribute to improving the drug development process. Some emerging technologies have the ability to measure multiple biological processes in a co-culture of mixed cell types, cells from different parts of the body, which is suggested to provide more similarity to in Vivo models.

Mathematical pharmacokinetic (PK) models aim to estimate concentration-time profiles within each organ on the basis of the initial drug dose. Such mathematical models can be relatively simple, treating the body as a single compartment in which the drug distribution reaches a rapid equilibrium after administration. Mathematical models can be highly accurate when all parameters involved are known. Models that combine PK or PBPK models with PD models can predict the time-dependent pharmacological effects of a drug. We can nowadays predict with PBPK models the PK of about any chemical in humans, almost from first principles. These models can be either very simple, like statistical dose-response models, or sophisticated and based on systems biology, according to the goal pursued and the data available. All we need for those models are good parameter values for the molecule of interest.

Microfluidic cell culture systems such as micro cell culture analogs (μCCAs) could be used in conjunction with PBPK models. These μCCAs scaled-down devices, termed also body-on-a-chip devices, can simulate multi-tissue interactions under near-physiological fluid flow conditions and with realistic tissue-to-tissue size ratios . Data obtained with these systems may be used to test and refine mechanistic hypotheses. Microfabricating devices also allows us to custom-design them and scale the organs' compartments correctly with respect to one another.

Because the device can be used with both animal and human cells, it can facilitate cross-species extrapolation. Used in conjunction with PBPK models, the devices permit an estimation of effective concentrations that can be used for studies with animal models or predict the human response. In the development of multicompartment devices, representations of the human body such as those in used PBPK models can be used to guide the device design with regard to the arrangement of chambers and fluidic channel connections to augment the drug development process, resulting in increased success in clinical trials.

== See also ==
- Lab-on-a-chip
- Microphysiometry
- ChIP-on-chip
