= Christoph Merten =

German bio-engineer and entrepreneur

Professor Christoph Merten
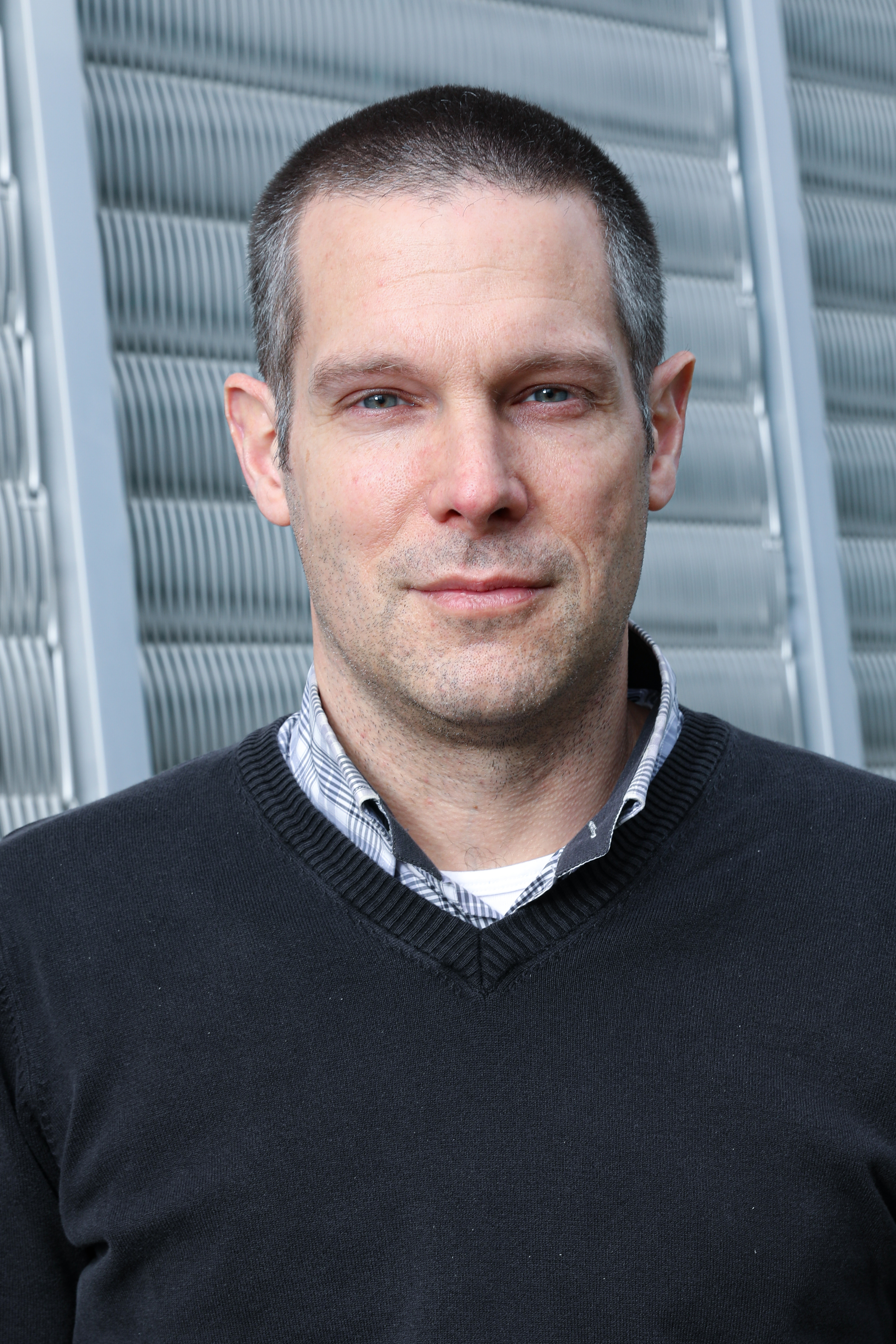
- Christoph Merten in 2021
- Born: 1976 (age 49–50); Bielefeld, Germany
- Occupations: Professor and entrepreneur
- Known for: Development of droplet-based microfluidic technologies for biomedical applications

Academic background
- Education: Goethe University of Frankfurt
- Doctoral advisor: Christian Buchholz

Academic work
- Discipline: Bioengineering
- Sub-discipline: Droplet-based Microfluidics
- Institutions: EPFL (École Polytechnique Fédérale de Lausanne)

Christoph Merten (born 1976) is a German bio-engineer and entrepreneur; currently professor at EPFL (École Polytechnique Fédérale de Lausanne). He is an adjunct scientist at the Ludwig Institute for Cancer Research in Lausanne. His research focuses on developing biomedical microfluidics technologies for drug discovery, diagnostics, and personalized therapy in cancer research.

== Career ==
Christoph studied biochemistry and organic chemistry at the Goethe University Frankfurt, Germany. He did his PhD at the Paul Ehrlich Institute in Langen, Germany before having a first postdoctoral research position at the Medical Research Council, Laboratory for Molecular Biology, in Cambridge, UK.

In 2005, he started a second postdoctoral appointment at the Institut de science et d'ingénierie supramoléculaires (ISIS) in Strasbourg, France. He focused on droplet-based microfluidics for cellular assays and started his research group in 2007. From 2010 to 2019, he served as a group leader at the European Molecular Biology Laboratory in Heidelberg, where he established high-throughput droplet-based microfluidic screening platforms.

In 2019, he was named associate professor of bioengineering at EPFL and currently leads the laboratory for biomedical microfluidics (LBMM) within the School of Engineering. He also holds an adjunct scientist position at the Ludwig Institute for Cancer Research's Lausanne branch.

=== Entrepreneurship ===
In 2017 he became the scientific founder of Velabs Therapeutics, a microfluidic antibody discovery company now operating as Veraxa Biotech. He is also leading the TheraMe! consortium, developing microfluidic technologies for personalized cancer treatment. This work resulted in the foundation of the EPFL-based Startup TheraMe! in 2023.

== Research ==
His laboratory currently uses droplet-based approaches to address questions related to personalized medicine, biological screening assays, and genomics. In the context of cancer therapy, this work has allowed cost-efficient screening of numerous drug combinations on tumor samples issued from patient biopsies, enabling rapid determination of personalized treatment regimens for cancer patients.

== Selected publications ==
- Clausell-Tormos, Jenifer; Lieber, Diana; Baret, Jean-Christophe; El-Harrak, Abdeslam; Miller, Oliver J.; Frenz, Lucas; Blouwolff, Joshua; Humphry, Katherine J.; Köster, Sarah; Duan, Honey; Holtze, Christian; Weitz, David A.; Griffiths, Andrew D.; Merten, Christoph A. (2008). "Droplet-Based Microfluidic Platforms for the Encapsulation and Screening of Mammalian Cells and Multicellular Organisms". Chemistry & Biology. 15 (5): 427–437. doi:10.1016/j.chembiol.2008.04.004. PMID 18482695.
- Debs, B. E.; Utharala, R.; Balyasnikova, I. V.; Griffiths, A. D.; Merten, C. A. (2012). "Functional single-cell hybridoma screening using droplet-based microfluidics". Proceedings of the National Academy of Sciences. 109 (29): 11570–11575. Bibcode:2012PNAS..10911570D. doi:10.1073/pnas.1204514109. PMC 3406880. PMID 22753519.
- Chaipan, Chawaree; Pryszlak, Anna; Dean, Hansi; Poignard, Pascal; Benes, Vladimir; Griffiths, Andrew D.; Merten, Christoph A. (2017). "Single-Virus Droplet Microfluidics for High-Throughput Screening of Neutralizing Epitopes on HIV Particles". Cell Chemical Biology. 24 (6): 751–757.e3. doi:10.1016/j.chembiol.2017.05.009. PMID 28552581.
- Shembekar, Nachiket; Hu, Hongxing; Eustace, David; Merten, Christoph A. (2018). "Single-Cell Droplet Microfluidic Screening for Antibodies Specifically Binding to Target Cells". Cell Reports. 22 (8): 2206–2215. doi:10.1016/j.celrep.2018.01.071. PMC 5842027. PMID 29466744.
- Eduati, Federica; Utharala, Ramesh; Madhavan, Dharanija; Neumann, Ulf Peter; Longerich, Thomas; Cramer, Thorsten; Saez-Rodriguez, Julio; Merten, Christoph A. (2018). "A microfluidics platform for combinatorial drug screening on cancer biopsies". Nature Communications. 9 (1): 2434. Bibcode:2018NatCo...9.2434E. doi:10.1038/s41467-018-04919-w. PMC 6015045. PMID 29934552.
