= Digital microfluidics =

Digital microfluidics (DMF) is a platform for lab-on-a-chip systems that is based upon the manipulation of microdroplets. Droplets are dispensed, moved, stored, mixed, reacted, or analyzed on a platform with a set of insulated electrodes. Digital microfluidics can be used together with analytical analysis procedures such as mass spectrometry, colorimetry, electrochemical, and electrochemiluminescense.

== Overview ==
Aqueous droplet sitting on top of an open microfluidic system with a cross section view. Device design can be manipulated to fit user's needs (modified electrodes, electrode pattern, materials used, etc.).[3][4]

In analogy to digital microelectronics, digital microfluidic operations can be combined and reused within hierarchical design structures so that complex procedures (e.g. chemical synthesis or biological assays) can be built up step-by-step. And in contrast to continuous-flow microfluidics, digital microfluidics works much the same way as traditional bench-top protocols, only with much smaller volumes and much higher automation. Thus a wide range of established chemical procedures and protocols can be seamlessly transferred to a nanoliter droplet format. Electrowetting, dielectrophoresis, and immiscible-fluid flows are the three most commonly used principles, which have been used to generate and manipulate microdroplets in a digital microfluidic device.

A digital microfluidic (DMF) device set-up depends on the substrates used, the electrodes, the configuration of those electrodes, the use of a dielectric material, the thickness of that dielectric material, the hydrophobic layers, and the applied voltage.

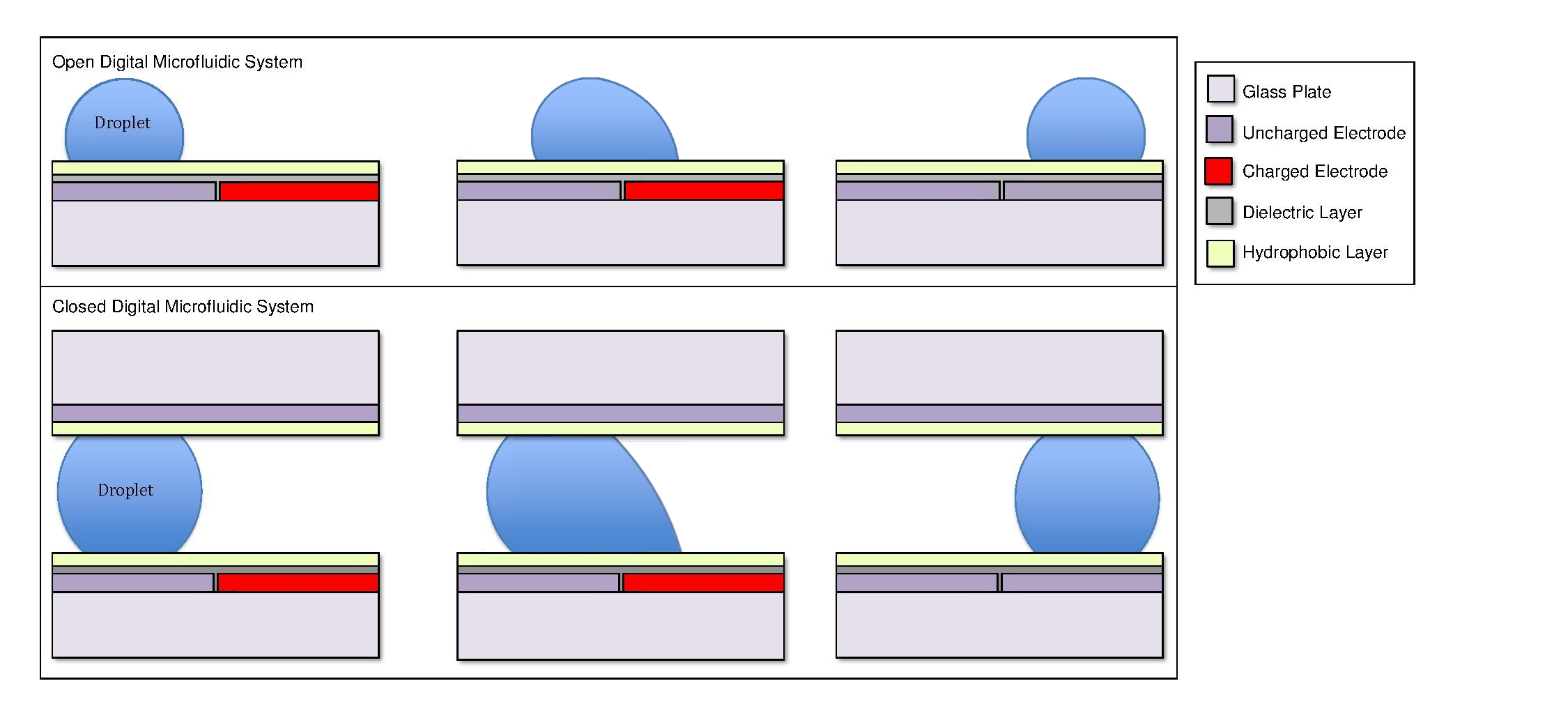
Aqueous droplet sitting on top of an open and closed digital microfluidic system with a cross section view. This shows the movement of the droplet once an electrode is activated. Device design can be manipulated to fit user's needs (modified electrodes, electrode pattern, materials used, etc.).[3][4]]]

A common substrate used in this type of system is glass. Depending if the system is open or closed, there would be either one or two layers of glass. The bottom layer of the device contains a patterned array of individually controllable electrodes. When looking at a closed system, there is usually a continuous ground electrode found through the top layer made usually of indium tin oxide (ITO). The dielectric layer is found around the electrodes in the bottom layer of the device and is important for building up charges and electrical field gradients on the device. A hydrophobic layer is applied to the top layer of the system to decrease the surface energy where the droplet will actually be in contact with. The applied voltage activates the electrodes and allows changes in the wettability of droplet on the device's surface. In order to move a droplet, a control voltage is applied to an electrode adjacent to the droplet, and at the same time, the electrode just under the droplet is deactivated. By varying the electric potential along a linear array of electrodes, electrowetting can be used to move droplets along this line of electrodes.

Modifications to this foundation can also be fabricated into the basic design structure. One example of this is the addition of electrochemiluminescence detectors within the indium tin oxide layer (the ground electrode in a closed system) which aid in the detection of luminophores in droplets. In general, different materials may also be used to replace basic components of a DMF system such as the use of PDMS instead of glass for the substrate. Liquid materials can be added, such as oil or another substance, to a closed system to prevent evaporation of materials and decrease surface contamination. Also, DMF systems can be compatible with ionic liquid droplets with the use of an oil in a closed device or with the use of a catena (a suspended wire) over an open DMF device.

Digital microfluidics can be light-activated. Optoelectrowetting can be used to transport sessile droplets around a surface containing patterned photoconductors. The photoelectrowetting effect can also be used to achieve droplet transport on a silicon wafer without the necessity of patterned electrodes.

== Working principle ==
Droplets are formed using the surface tension properties of a liquid. For example, water placed on a hydrophobic surface such as wax paper will form spherical droplets to minimize its contact with the surface. Differences in surface hydrophobicity affect a liquid's ability to spread and 'wet' a surface by changing the contact angle. As the hydrophobicity of a surface increases, the contact angle increases, and the ability of the droplet to wet the surface decreases. The change in contact angle, and therefore wetting, is regulated by the Young-Lippmann equation.

$\cos(\theta)=\cos(\theta{_0})+\frac{\varepsilon{_0}\varepsilon{_r}V^2}{{2\gamma}d}$

where $\theta$ is the contact angle with an applied voltage $V$; $\theta{_0}$ is the contact angle with no voltage; $\varepsilon{_r}$ is the relative permittivity of the dielectric; $\varepsilon{_0}$ is the permittivity of free space; $\gamma$ is the liquid/filler media surface tension; $d$ is the dielectric thickness.

In some cases, the hydrophobicity of a substrate can be controlled by using electrical fields. This refers to the phenomenon Electrowetting On Dielectric (EWOD).[3][4] For example, when no electric field is applied to an electrode, the surface will remain hydrophobic and a liquid droplet will form a more spherical droplet with a greater contact angle. When an electric field is applied, a polarized hydrophilic surface is created. The water droplet then becomes flattened and the contact angle decreases. By controlling the localization of this polarization, we can create an interfacial tension gradient that allows controlled displacement of the droplet across the surface of the DMF device.

== Droplet formation ==
There are two ways to make new droplets with a digital microfluidic device. Either an existing droplet can be split in two, or a new droplet can be made from a reservoir of material. Both processes are only known to work in closed devices, though this often is not a problem as the top plates of DMF devices are typically removable, so an open device can be made temporarily closed should droplet formation be necessary.

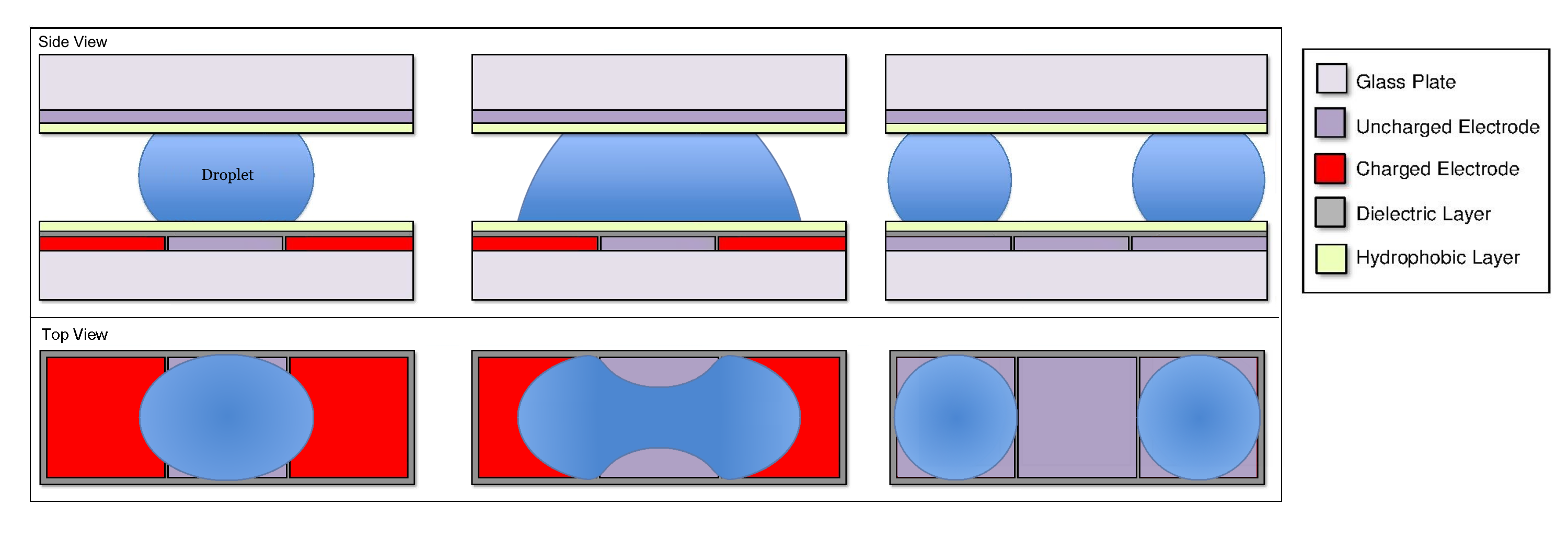
A side-on and top-down view of a droplet being split in a DMF device, where the progression of time is shown left to right.

=== From an existing droplet ===
A droplet can be split by charging two electrodes on opposite sides of a droplet on an uncharged electrode. In the same way a droplet on an uncharged electrode will move towards an adjacent, charged electrode, this droplet will move towards both active electrodes. Liquid moves to either side, which causes the middle of the droplet to neck. For a droplet of the same size as the electrodes, splitting will occur approximately when $R_{neck}/R_{end}=-1$, as the neck will be at its thinnest. $R_{neck}$ is the radius of curvature of the menisci at the neck, which is negative for a concave curve, and $R_{end}$ is the radius of curvature of the menisci at the elongated ends of the droplet. This process is simple and consistently results in two droplets of equal volume.

The conventional method of splitting an existing droplet by simply turning the splitting electrodes on and off produces new droplets of relatively equal volume. However, the new droplets formed by the conventional method show considerable difference in volume. This difference is caused by local perturbations due to the rapid mass transport. Even though the difference is negligible in some applications, it can still pose a problem in applications that are highly sensitive to variations in volume, such as immunoassays and DNA amplification. To overcome the limitation of the conventional method, an existing droplet can be split by gradually changing the potential of the electrodes at the splitting region instead of simply switching them on and off. Using this method, a noticeable improvement in droplet volume variation, from around 10% variation in volume to less than 1% variation in volume, has been reported.

=== From a reservoir ===
Creating a new droplet from a reservoir of liquid can be done in a similar fashion to splitting a droplet. In this case, the reservoir remains stationary while a sequence of electrodes are used to draw liquid out of the reservoir. This drawn liquid and the reservoir form a neck of liquid, akin to the neck of a splitting droplet but longer, and the collapsing of this neck forms a dispensed droplet from the drawn liquid. In contrast to splitting, though, dispensing droplets in this manner is inconsistent in scale and results. There is no reliable distance liquid will need to be pulled from the reservoir for the neck to collapse, if it even collapses at all. Because this distance varies, the volumes of dispensed droplets will also vary within the same device.

Due to these inconsistencies, alternative techniques for dispensing droplets have been used and proposed, including drawing liquid out of reservoirs in geometries that force a thinner neck, using a continuous and replenishable electrowetting channel, and moving reservoirs into corners so as to cut the reservoir down the middle. Multiple iterations of the latter can produce droplets of more manageable sizes.

== Droplet manipulation ==
=== Droplet merging ===
As an existing droplet can be split to form discrete droplets using electrodes (see From an existing droplet), droplets can be merged into one droplet by electrodes as well. Utilizing the same concept applied for creating new droplets through splitting an existing droplet with electrodes, an aqueous droplet resting on an uncharged electrode can move towards a charged electrode where droplets will join and merge into one droplet. However, the merged droplet might not always form a circular shape even after the merging process is over due to surface tension. This problem can be solved by implementing a superhydrophobic surface between the droplets and the electrodes. Oil droplets can be merged in the same way as well, but oil droplets will move towards uncharged electrodes unlike aqueous droplets.

=== Droplet transportation ===
Discrete droplets can be transported in a highly controlled way using an array of electrodes. In the same way droplets move from an uncharged electrode to a charged electrode, or vice versa, droplets can be continuously transported along the electrodes by sequentially energizing the electrodes. Since droplet transportation involves an array of electrodes, multiple electrodes can be programmed to selectively apply a voltage to each electrode for a better control over transporting multiple droplets.

=== Displacement by electrostatic actuation ===
Three-dimensional droplet actuation has been made possible by implementing a closed system; this system contains a μL sized droplet in immiscible fluid medium. The droplet and medium are then sandwiched between two electromagnetic plates, creating an EM field between the two plates. The purpose of this method is to transfer the droplet from a lower planar surface to an upper parallel planar surface and back down via electrostatic forces. The physics behind such particle actuation and perpendicular movement can be understood from early works of N. N. Lebedev and I. P. Skal'skaya. In their research, they attempted to model the Maxwell electrical charge acquired by a perfectly round conducting particle in the presence of a uniform magnetic field caused by a perfectly-conducting and infinitely-stretching surface. Their model helps to predict the Z-direction motion of the microdroplets within the device as it points to the magnitude and direction of forces acting upon a micro droplet. This can be used to help accurately predict and correct for unwanted and uncontrollable particle movement. The model explains why failing to employ dielectric coating on one of the two surfaces causes reversal of charge within the droplet upon contact with each electrode and in turn causes the droplets to uncontrollably bounce of between electrodes.

Digital microfluidics (DMF), has already been readily adapted in many biological fields. By enabling three-dimensional movement within DMF, the technology can be used even more extensively in biological applications, as it could more accurately mimic 3-D microenvironments. A large benefit of employing this type of method is that it allows for two different environments to be accessible by the droplet, which can be taken advantage of by splitting the microfluidic tasks among the two surfaces. For example, while the lower plane can be used to move droplets, the upper plate can carry out the necessary chemical and/or biological processes. This advantage can be translated into practical experiment protocols in the biological community, such as coupling with DNA amplification. This also allows for the chip to be smaller, and to give researchers more freedom in designing platforms for microdroplet analysis.

=== All-terrain droplet actuation (ATDA) ===
All-terrain microfluidics is a method used to transport liquid droplets over non-traditional surface types. Unlike traditional microfluidics platform, which are generally restricted to planar and horizontal surfaces, ATDA enables droplet manipulation over curved, non-horizontal, and inverted surfaces. This is made possible by incorporating flexible thin sheets of copper and polyimide into the surface via a rapid prototyping method. This device works very well with many liquids, including aqueous buffers, solutions of proteins and DNA, and undiluted bovine serum. ATDA is compatible with silicone oil or pluronic additives, such as F-68, which reduce non-specific absorption and biofouling when dealing with biological fluids such as proteins, biological serums, and DNA. A drawback of a setup like this is accelerated droplet evaporation. ATDA is a form of open digital microfluidics, and as such the device needs to be encapsulated in a humidified environment in order to minimize droplet evaporation.

== Implementation ==
In one of various embodiments of EWOD-based microfluidic biochips, investigated first by Cytonix in 1987 and subsequently commercialized by Advanced Liquid Logic, there are two parallel glass plates. The bottom plate contains a patterned array of individually controllable electrodes and the top plate is coated with a continuous grounding electrode. A dielectric insulator coated with a hydrophobic is added to the plates to decrease the wet-ability of the surface and to add capacitance between the droplet and the control electrode. The droplet containing biochemical samples and the filler medium, such as the silicone oil, a fluorinated oil, or air, are sandwiched between the plates and the droplets travel inside the filler medium. In order to move a droplet, a control voltage is applied to an electrode adjacent to the droplet, and at the same time, the electrode just under the droplet is deactivated. By varying the electric potential along a linear array of electrodes, electrowetting can be used to move droplets along this line of electrodes.

== Applications ==
=== Laboratory automation ===
In research fields such as synthetic biology, where highly iterative experimentation is common, considerable efforts have been made to automate workflows. Digital microfluidics is often touted as a laboratory automation solution, with a number of advantages over alternative solutions such as pipetting robots and droplet microfluidics. These stated advantages often include a reduction in the required volume of experimental reagents, a reduction in the likelihood of contamination and cross-contamination, potential improvements in reproducibility, increased throughput, individual droplet addressability, and the ability to integrate with sensor and detector modules to perform end-to-end or even closed loop workflow automation.

==== Reduced experimental footprint ====
One of the core advantages of digital microfluidics, and of microfluidics in general, is the use and actuation of picoliter to microliter scale volumes. Workflows adapted from the bench to a DMF system are miniaturized, meaning working volumes are reduced to fractions of what is normally required for conventional methods. For example, Thaitrong et al. developed a DMF system with a capillary electrophoresis (CE) module with the purpose of automating the process of next generation sequencing (NGS) library characterization. Compared to an Agilent BioAnalyzer (an instrument commonly used to measure sequencing library size distribution), the DMF-CE system consumed ten-fold less sample volume. Reducing volumes for a workflow can be especially beneficial if the reagents are expensive or when manipulating rare samples such as circulating tumor cells and prenatal samples. Miniaturization also means a reduction in waste product volumes.

==== Reduced probability of contamination ====
DMF-based workflows, particularly those using a closed configuration with a top-plate ground electrode, have been shown to be less susceptible to outside contamination compared to some conventional laboratory workflows. This can be attributed to minimal user interaction during automated steps, and the fact that the smaller volumes are less exposed to environmental contaminants than larger volumes which would need to be exposed to open air during mixing. Ruan et al. observed minimal contamination from exogenous nonhuman DNA and no cross-contamination between samples while using their DMF-based digital whole genome sequencing system.

==== Improved reproducibility ====
Overcoming issues of reproducibility has become a topic of growing concern across scientific disciplines. Reproducibility can be especially salient when multiple iterations of the same experimental protocol need to be repeated. Using liquid handling robots that can minimize volume loss between experimental steps are often used to reduce error rates and improve reproducibility. An automated DMF system for CRISPR-Cas9 genome editing was described by Sinha et al, and was used to culture and genetically modify H1299 lung cancer cells. The authors noted that no variation in knockout efficiencies across loci was observed when cells were cultured on the DMF device, whereas cells cultured in well-plates showed variability in upstream loci knockout efficiencies. This reduction in variability was attributed to culturing on a DMF device being more homogenous and reproducible compared with well plate methods.

==== Increased throughput ====
While DMF systems cannot match the same throughput achieved by some liquid handling pipetting robots, or by some droplet-based microfluidic systems, there are still throughput advantages when compared to conventional methods carried out manually.

==== Individual droplet addressability ====
DMF allows for droplet level addressability, meaning individual droplets can be treated as spatially distinct microreactors. This level of droplet control is important for workflows where reactions are sensitive to the order of reagent mixing and incubation times, but where the optimal values of these parameters may still need to be determined. These types of workflows are common in cell-free biology, and Liu et al. were able to demonstrate a proof-of-concept DMF-based strategy for carrying out remote-controlled cell-free protein expression on an OpenDrop chip.

==== Detector module integration for end-to-end and closed-loop automation ====
An often cited advantage DMF platforms have is their potential to integrate with on-chip sensors and off-chip detector modules. In theory, real-time and end-point data can be used in conjunction with machine learning methods to automate the process of parameter optimization.

=== Separation and extraction ===
Digital microfluidics can be used for separation and extraction of target analytes. These methods include the use of magnetic particles, liquid-liquid extraction, optical tweezers, and hydrodynamic effects.

==== Magnetic particles ====
For magnetic particle separations a droplet of solution containing the analyte of interest is placed on a digital microfluidics electrode array and moved by the changes in the charges of the electrodes. The droplet is moved to an electrode with a magnet on one side of the array with magnetic particles functionalized to bind to the analyte. Then it is moved over the electrode, the magnetic field is removed and the particles are suspended in the droplet. The droplet is swirled on the electrode array to ensure mixing. The magnet is reintroduced and the particles are immobilized and the droplet is moved away. This process is repeated with wash and elution buffers to extract the analyte.

Magnetic particles coated with antihuman serum albumin antibodies have been used to isolate human serum albumin, as proof of concept work for immunoprecipitation using digital microfluidics.^{5} DNA extraction from a whole blood sample has also been performed with digital microfluidics.^{3} The procedure follows the general methodology as the magnetic particles, but includes pre-treatment on the digital microfluidic platform to lyse the cells prior to DNA extraction.

==== Liquid-liquid extraction ====
Liquid-liquid extractions can be carried out on digital microfluidic device by taking advantage of immiscible liquids.^{9} Two droplets, one containing the analyte in aqueous phase, and the other an immiscible ionic liquid are present on the electrode array. The two droplets are mixed and the ionic liquid extracts the analyte, and the droplets are easily separable.

==== Optical tweezers ====
Optical tweezers have also been used to separate cells in droplets. Two droplets are mixed on an electrode array, one containing the cells, and the other with nutrients or drugs. The droplets are mixed and then optical tweezers are used to move the cells to one side of the larger droplet before it is split. For a more detailed explanation on the underlying principles, see Optical tweezers.

==== Hydrodynamic separation ====
Particles have been applied for use outside of magnetic separation, with hydrodynamic forces to separate particles from the bulk of a droplet. This is performed on electrode arrays with a central electrode and 'slices' of electrodes surrounding it. Droplets are added onto the array and swirled in a circular pattern, and the hydrodynamic forces from the swirling cause the particles to aggregate onto the central electrode.

=== Chemical synthesis ===
Digital Microfluidics (DMF) allows for precise manipulation and coordination in small-scale chemical synthesis reactions due to its ability to control micro scale volumes of liquid reagents, allowing for overall less reagent use and waste. This technology can be used in the synthesis compounds such as peptidomimetics and PET tracers. PET tracers require nanogram quantities and as such, DMF allows for automated and rapid synthesis of tracers with 90-95% efficiency compared to conventional macro-scale techniques.

Organic reagents are not commonly used in DMF because they tend to wet the DMF device and cause flooding; however synthesis of organic reagents can be achieved through DMF techniques by carrying the organic reagents through an ionic liquid droplet, thus preventing the organic reagent from flooding the DMF device. Droplets are combined together by inducing opposite charges thus attracting them to each other. This allows for automated mixing of droplets. Mixing of droplets are also used to deposit MOF crystals for printing by delivering reagents into wells and evaporating the solutions for crystal deposition. This method of MOF crystal deposition is relatively cheap and does not require extensive robotic equipment.

Chemical synthesis using digital microfluidics (DMF) has been applied to many noteworthy biological reactions. These include polymerase chain reaction (PCR), as well as the formation of DNA and peptides. Reduction, alkylation, and enzymatic digestion have also shown robustness and reproducibility utilizing DMF, indicating potential in the synthesis and manipulation of proteomics. Spectra obtained from the products of these reactions are often identical to their library spectra, while only utilizing a small fraction of bench-scale reactants. Thus, conducting these syntheses on the microscale has the benefit of limiting money spent on purchasing reagents and waste products produced while yielding desirable experimental results. However, numerous challenges need to be overcome to push these reactions to completion through DMF. There have been reports of reduced efficiency in chemical reactions as compared to bench-scale versions of the same syntheses, as lower product yields have been observed. Furthermore, since picoliter and nanoliter size samples must be analyzed, any instrument used in analysis needs to be high in sensitivity. In addition, system setup is often difficult due to extensive amounts of wiring and pumps that are required to operate microchannels and reservoirs. Finally, samples are often subject to solvent evaporation which leads to changes in volume and concentration of reactants, and in some cases reactions to not go to completion.

The composition and purity of molecules synthesized by DMF are often determined utilizing classic analytical techniques. Nuclear magnetic resonance (NMR) spectroscopy has been successfully applied to analyze corresponding intermediates, products, and reaction kinetics. A potential issue that arises through the use of NMR is low mass sensitivity, however this can be corrected for by employing microcoils that assist in distinguishing molecules of differing masses. This is necessary since the signal-to-noise ratio of sample sizes in the microliter to nanoliter range is dramatically reduced compared to bench-scale sample sizes, and microcoils have been shown to resolve this issue. Mass spectrometry (MS) and high-performance liquid chromatography (HPLC) have also been used to overcome this challenge. Although MS is an attractive analytical technique for distinguishing the products of reactions accomplished through DMF, it poses its own weaknesses. Matrix-assisted laser desorption ionization (MALDI) and electrospray ionization (ESI) MS have recently been paired with analyzing microfluidic chemical reactions. However, crystallization and dilution associated with these methods often leads to unfavorable side effects, such as sample loss and side reactions occurring. The use of MS in DMF is discussed in more detail in a later section.

=== Cell culture ===
Connecting the DMF chip to use in the field or world-to-chip interfaces have been accomplished by means of manual pumps and reservoirs which deliver microbes, cells, and media to the device. The lack of extensive pumps and valves allow for elaborate multi step applications involving cells performed in a simple and compact system. In one application, microbial cultures have been transferred onto the chip and allowed to grow with the use of sterile procedures and temperature required for microbial incubation. To validate that this was a viable space for microbial growth, a transformation assay was carried out in the device. This involves exposing E.coli to a vector and heat shocking the bacteria until they take up the DNA. This is then followed by running a DNA gel to assure that the wanted vector was taken up by the bacteria. This study found that the DNA indeed was taken up by the bacteria and expressed as predicted.

Human cells have also been manipulated in Digital Microfluidic Immunocytochemistry in Single Cells (DISC) where DMF platforms were used to culture and use antibodies to label phosphorylated proteins in the cell. Cultured cells are then removed and taken off chip for screening. Another technique synthesizes hydrogels within DMF platforms. This process uses electrodes to deliver reagents to produce the hydrogel, and delivery of cell culture reagents for absorption into the gel. The hydrogels are an improvement over 2D cell culture because 3D cell culture have increased cell-cell interactions and cel-extracellular matrix interactions. Spherical cell cultures are another method developed around the ability of DMF to deliver droplets to cells. Application of an electric potential allows for automation of droplet transfer directly to the hanging cell culture.^{]} This is beneficial as 3 dimensional cell culture and spheroids better mimic in vivo tissue by allowing for more biologically relevant cultures that have cells growing in an extracellular matrix similarly resembling that in the human body. Another use of DMF platforms in cell culture is its ability to conduct in vitro cell-free cloning using single molecule PCR inside droplets. PCR amplified products are then validated by transfection into yeast cells and a Western blot protein identification.

Problems arising from cell culture applications using DMF include protein adsorption to the device floor, and cytotoxicity to cells. To prevent adsorption of protein to the platform's floor, a surfactant stabilized Silicon oil or hexane was used to coat the surface of the device, and droplets were manipulated atop of the oil or hexane. Hexane was later rapidly evaporated from cultures to prevent a toxic effect on cell cultures. Another approach to solve protein adhesion is the addition of Pluronic additives to droplets in the device. Pluronic additives are generally not cytotoxic but some have been shown to be harmful to cell cultures.

Bio-compatibility of device set up is important for biological analyses. Along with finding Pluronic additives that are not cytotoxic, creating a device whose voltage and disruptive movement would not affect cell viability was accomplished. Through the readout of live/dead assays it was shown that neither voltage required to move droplets, nor the motion of moving cultures affected cell viability.

==== Biological extraction ====
Biological separations usually involve low concentration high volume samples. This can pose an issue for digital microfluidics due to the small sample volume necessary. Digital microfluidic systems can be combined with a macrofluidic system designed to decrease sample volume, in turn increasing analyte concentration. It follows the same principles as the magnetic particles for separation, but includes pumping of the droplet to cycle a larger volume of fluid around the magnetic particles. Extraction of drug analytes from dried urine samples has also been reported. A droplet of extraction solvent, in this case methanol, is repeatedly flowed over a sample of dried urine sample then moved to a final electrode where the liquid is extracted through a capillary and then analyzed using mass spectrometry.

==== Immunoassays ====
The advanced fluid handling capabilities of digital microfluidics (DMF) allows for the adoption of DMF as an immunoassay platform as DMF devices can precisely manipulate small quantities of liquid reagents. Both heterogeneous immunoassays (antigens interacting with immobilized antibodies) and homogeneous immunoassays (antigens interacting with antibodies in solution) have been developed using a DMF platform. With regards to heterogeneous immunoassays, DMF can simplify the extended and intensive procedural steps by performing all delivery, mixing, incubation, and washing steps on the surface of the device (on-chip). Further, existing immunoassay techniques and methods, such as magnetic bead-based assays, ELISAs, and electrochemical detection, have been incorporated onto DMF immunoassay platforms.

The incorporation of magnetic bead-based assays onto a DMF immunoassay platform has been demonstrated for the detection of multiple analytes, such as human insulin, IL-6, cardiac marker Troponin I (cTnI), thyroid stimulating hormone (TSH), sTNF-RI, and 17β-estradiol. For example, a magnetic bead-based approached has been used for the detection of cTnI from whole blood in less than 8 minutes. Briefly, magnetic beads containing primary antibodies were mixed with labeled secondary antibodies, incubated, and immobilized with a magnet for the washing steps. The droplet was then mixed with a chemiluminescent reagent and detection of the accompanying enzymatic reaction was measured on-chip with a photomultiplier tube.

The ELISA template, commonly used for performing immunoassays and other enzyme-based biochemical assays, has been adapted for use with the DMF platform for the detection of analytes such as IgE and IgG. In one example, a series of bioassays were conducted to establish the quantification capabilities of DMF devices, including an ELISA-based immunoassay for the detection of IgE. Superparamagnetic nanoparticles were immobilized with anti-IgE antibodies and fluorescently labeled aptamers to quantify IgE using an ELISA template. Similarly, for the detection of IgG, IgG can be immobilized onto a DMF chip, conjugated with horseradish-peroxidase (HRP)-labeled IgG, and then quantified through measurement of the color change associated with product formation of the reaction between HRP and tetramethylbenzidine.

To further expand the capabilities and applications of DMF immunoassays beyond colorimetric detection (i.e., ELISA, magnetic bead-based assays), electrochemical detection tools (e.g., microelectrodes) have been incorporated into DMF chips for the detection of analytes such as TSH and rubella virus. For example, Rackus et al. integrated microelectrodes onto a DMF chip surface and substituted a previously reported chemiluminescent IgG immunoassay with an electroactive species, enabling detection of rubella virus. They coated magnetic beads with rubella virus, anti-rubella IgG, and anti-human IgG coupled with alkaline phosphatase, which in turn catalyzed an electron transfer reaction that was detected by the on-chip microelectrodes.

=== Mass spectrometry ===
The coupling of digital microfluidics (DMF) and Mass Spectrometry can largely be categorized into indirect off-line analysis, direct off-line analysis, and in-line analysis and the main advantages of this coupling are decreased solvent and reagent use, as well as decreased analysis times.

Indirect off-line analysis is the usage of DMF devices to combine reactants and isolate products, which are then removed and manually transferred to a mass spectrometer. This approach takes advantage of DMF for the sample preparation step but also introduces opportunities for contamination as manual intervention is required to transfer the sample. In one example of this technique, a Grieco three-component condensation was carried out on chip and was taken off the chip by micropipette for quenching and further analysis.

Direct off-line analysis is the usage of DMF devices that have been fabricated and incorporated partially or totally into a mass spectrometer. This process is still considered off-line, however as some post-reaction procedures may be carried out manually (but on chip), without the use of the digital capabilities of the device. Such devices are most often used in conjugation with MALDI-MS. In MALDI-based direct off-line devices, the droplet must be dried and recrystallized along with matrix – operations that oftentimes require vacuum chambers. The chip with crystallized analyte is then placed in to the MALDI-MS for analysis. One issue raised with MALDI-MS coupling to DMF is that the matrix necessary for MALDI-MS can be highly acidic, which may interfere with the on-chip reactions

Inline analysis is the usage of devices that feed directly into mass spectrometers, thereby eliminating any manual manipulation. Inline analysis may require specially fabricated devices and connecting hardware between the device and the mass spectrometer. Inline analysis is often coupled with electrospray ionization. In one example, a DMF chip was fabricated with a hole that led to a microchannel This microchannel was, in turn, connected to an electrospray ionizer that emitted directly into a mass spectrometer. Integration ambient ionization techniques where ions are formed outside of the mass spectrometer with little or no treatment pairs well with the open or semi-open microfluidic nature of DMF and allows easy inline couping between DMF and MS systems. Ambient Ionization techniques such as Surface Acoustic Wave (SAW) ionization generate surface waves on a flat piezoelectric surface that imparts enough acoustic energy on the liquid interface to overcome surface tension and desorb ions off the chip into the mass analyzer. Some couplings utilize an external high-voltage pulse source at the physical inlet to the mass spectrometer but the true role of such additions is uncertain.

A significant barrier to the widespread integration of DMF with mass spectrometry is biological contamination, often termed bio-fouling. High throughput analysis is a significant advantage in the use of DMF systems, but means that they are particularly susceptible to cross contamination between experiments. As a result, the coupling of DMF with mass spectrometry often requires the integration of a variety of methods to prevent cross contamination such as multiple washing steps, biologically compatible surfactants, and or super hydrophobic surfaces to prevent droplet adsorption. In one example, a reduction in cross contaminant signal during the characterization of an amino acid required 4-5 wash steps between each sample droplet for the contamination intensity to fall below the limit of detection.

==== Miniature Mass Spectrometers ====
Conventional mass spectrometers are often large as well as prohibitively expensive and complex in their operation which has led to the increased attractiveness of miniature mass spectrometers (MMS) for a variety of applications. MMS are optimized towards affordability and simple operation, often forgoing the need for experienced technicians, having a low cost of manufacture, and being small enough in size to allow for the transfer of data collection from the laboratory into the field. These advantages often come at the cost of reduced performance where MMS resolution, as well as the limits of detection and quantitation, are often barely adequate to perform specialized tasks. The integration of DMF with MMS has the potential for significant improvement of MMS systems by increasing throughput, resolution, and automation, while decreasing solvent cost, enabling lab grade analysis at a much reduced cost. In one example the use of a custom DMF system for urine drug testing enabled the creation of an instrument weighing only 25 kg with performance comparable to standard laboratory analysis.

=== Nuclear magnetic resonance spectroscopy ===
Nuclear magnetic resonance (NMR) spectroscopy can be used in conjunction with digital microfluidics (DMF) through the use of NMR microcoils, which are electromagnetic conducting coils that are less than 1 mm in size. Due to their size, these microcoils have several limitations, directly influencing the sensitivity of the machinery they operate within.

Microchannel/microcoil interfaces, previous to digital microfluidics, had several drawbacks such as in that many created large amounts of solvent waste and were easily contaminated. In this way, the use of digital microfluidics and its capability to manipulate singlet droplets is promising.

The interface between digital microfluidics and NMR relaxometry has led to the creation of systems such as those used to detect and quantify the concentrations of specific molecules on microscales with some such systems using two step processes in which DMF devices guide droplets to the NMR detection site. Introductory systems of high-field NMR and 2D NMR in conjunction with microfluidics have also been developed. These systems use single plate DMF devices with NMR microcoils in place of the second plate. Recently, further modified version of this interface included pulsed field gradients (PFG) units that enabled this platform to perform more sophisticated NMR measurements (e.g. NMR diffusometry, gradients encoded pulse measurements). This system has been successfully applied into monitoring rapid organic reactions.
