= Optoelectrowetting =

Optoelectrowetting (OEW) is a method of liquid droplet manipulation used in microfluidics applications. This technique builds on the principle of electrowetting, which has proven useful in liquid actuation due to fast switching response times and low power consumption. Where traditional electrowetting runs into challenges, however, such as in the simultaneous manipulation of multiple droplets, OEW presents a lucrative alternative that is both simpler and cheaper to produce. OEW surfaces are easy to fabricate, since they require no lithography, and have real-time, reconfigurable, large-scale manipulation control, due to its reaction to light intensity.

== Theory ==
The traditional electrowetting mechanism has been receiving increasing interest due to its ability to control tension forces on a liquid droplet. As surface tension acts as the dominant liquid actuation force in nano-scale applications, electrowetting has been used to modify this tension at the solid-liquid interface through the application of an external voltage. The applied electric field causes a change in the contact angle of the liquid droplet, and in turn changes the surface tensions across the droplet. Precise manipulation of the electric field allows control of the droplets. The droplet is placed on an insulating substrate located in between an electrode.cooxoxc9x

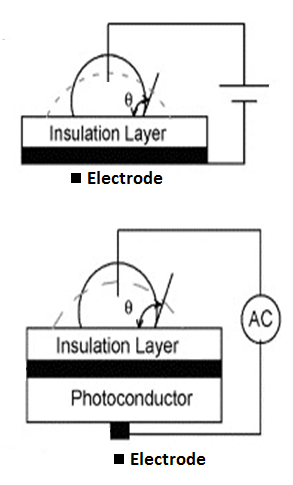
Optoelectrowetting against traditional electrowetting diagram

The optoelectrowetting mechanism adds a photoconductor underneath the conventional electrowetting circuit, with an AC power source attached. Under normal (dark) conditions, the majority of the system's impedance lies in the photoconducting region, and therefore the majority of the voltage drop occurs here. However, when light is shined on the system, carrier generation and recombination causes the conductivity of the photoconductor spikes and results in a voltage drop across the insulating layer, changing the contact angle as a function of the voltage. The contact angle between a liquid and electrode can be described as:

$$\cos\big(\theta(V_A)\big) = \cos\big(\theta(0)\big) + \frac{1}{2}\left(\frac{\epsilon}{d \gamma_{LV}}\right)V_A^2 \,$$

where V_{A}, d, ε, and γ_{LV} are applied voltage, thickness of the insulation layer, dielectric constant of the insulation layer, and the interfacial tension constant between liquid and gas. In AC situations, such as OEW, V_{A} is replaced with the RMS voltage. The frequency of the AC power source is adjusted so that the impedance of the photoconductor dominates in the dark state. The shift in the voltage drop across the insulating layer therefore reduces the contact angle of the droplet as a function of the light intensity. By shining an optical beam on one edge of a liquid droplet, the reduced contact angle creates a pressure difference throughout the droplet, and pushes the droplet's center of mass towards the illuminated side. Control of the optical beam results in control of the droplet's movement.

Using 4 mW laser beams, OEW has proven to move droplets of deionized water at speeds of 7mm/s.

Traditional electrowetting runs into problems because it requires a two-dimensional array of electrodes for droplet actuation. The large number of electrodes leads to complexity for both control and packaging of these chips, especially for droplet sizes of smaller scales. While this problem can be solved through integration of electronic decoders, the cost of the chip would significantly increase.

== Single-sided continuous optoelectrowetting (SCOEW) ==
Droplet manipulation in electrowetting-based devices are usually accomplished using two parallel plates which sandwiches the droplet and is actuated by digital electrodes. The minimum droplet size that can be manipulated is determined by the size of pixilated electrodes. This mechanism provides a solution to the size limitation of physical pixilated electrodes by utilizing dynamic and reconfigurable optical patterns and enables operations such as continuous transport, splitting, merging, and mixing of droplets. SCOEW is conducted on open, featureless, and photoconductive surfaces. This configuration creates a flexible interface that allows simple integration with other microfluidic components, such as sample reservoirs through simple tubing.

It is also known as open optoelectrowetting (O-OEW).

== Optoelectrowetting using a photocapacitance ==
Optoelectrowetting can also be achieved using the photocapacitance in a liquid–insulator–semiconductor junction. The photo-sensitive electrowetting is achieved via optical modulation of carriers in the space charge region at the insulator-semiconductor junction which acts as a photodiode – similar to a charge-coupled device based on a metal–oxide–semiconductor structure.

== Types of applications ==
=== Clinical diagnostics ===
Electrowetting presents a solution to one of the most challenging tasks in lab-on-a-chip systems in its ability to handle and manipulate complete physiological compounds. Conventional microfluidic systems aren't easily adaptable to handle different compounds, requiring reconfiguration that often results in the device being impractical as a whole. Through OEW, a chip with one power source can be readily used with a variety of substances, with potential for multiplexed detection.

=== Optical actuation ===
Photoactuation in microelectromechanical systems (MEMS) has been demonstrated in proof-of-concept experiments. Instead of a typical substrate, a specialized cantilever is placed on top of the liquid-insulator-photoconductor stack. As light is shined on the photoconductor, the capillary force from the drop on the cantilever changes with the contact angle, and deflects the beam. This wireless actuation can be used as a substitute for complex circuit-based systems currently used for optical addressing and control of autonomous wireless sensors

== See also ==
- photoelectrowetting
