= Droplet-based microfluidics =

Droplet-based microfluidics manipulate discrete volumes of fluids in immiscible phases with low Reynolds number (<< 2300) and laminar flow regimes. An early example for using droplet-based microfluidics was a flow-through chip reactor for miniaturized PCR. Interest in droplet-based microfluidics systems has been growing substantially in past decades. Microdroplets offer the feasibility of handling miniature volumes (μL to fL) of fluids conveniently, provide better mixing, encapsulation, sorting, sensing and are suitable for high throughput experiments. Two immiscible phases used for the droplet based systems are referred to as the continuous phase (medium in which droplets flow) and dispersed phase (the droplet phase), resulting in either water-in-oil (W/O) or oil-in-water (O/W) emulsion droplets.

== Droplet formation methods ==
In order for droplet formation to occur, two immiscible phases, referred to as the continuous phase (medium in which droplets are generated) and dispersed phase (the droplet phase), must be used. The size of the generated droplets is mainly controlled by the flow rate ratio of the continuous phase and dispersed phase, interfacial tension between two phases, and the geometry of the channels used for droplet generation. Droplets can be formed both passively and actively. Active droplet formation (electric, magnetic, centrifugal) often uses similar devices to passive formation but requires an external energy input for droplet manipulation. Passive droplet formation tends to be more common than active as it produces similar results with simpler device designs. Generally, three types of microfluidic geometries are utilized for passive droplet generation: (i) cross-flowing, (ii) flow focusing, and (iii) co-flowing. Droplet-based microfluidics often operate under low Reynolds numbers to ensure laminar flow within the system. Droplet size is often quantified with coefficient of variation (CV) as a description of the standard deviation from the mean droplet size. Each of the listed methods provide a way to generate microfluidic droplets in a controllable and tunable manner with proper variable manipulation.

=== Cross-flowing droplet formation ===
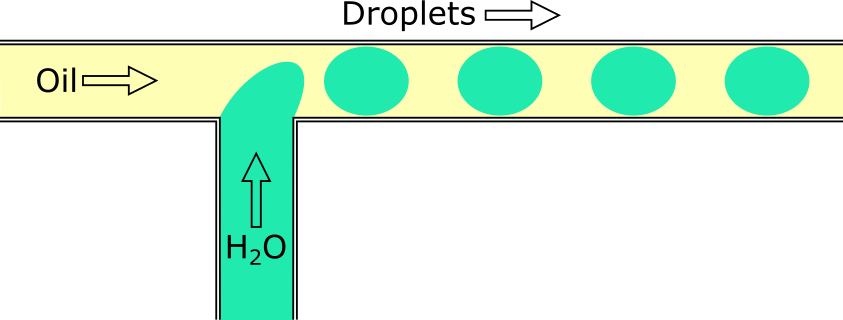
Droplet formation using a T-junction.

Formation of droplets with a T junction microfluidic device. The break off of a droplet comes from a drop in pressure as a drop emerges.

Cross-flowing is a passive formation method that involves the continuous and aqueous phases running at an angle to each other. Most commonly, the channels are perpendicular in a T-shaped junction with the dispersed phase intersecting the continuous phase; other configurations such as a Y-junction are also possible. The dispersed phase extends into the continuous and is stretched until shear forces break off a droplet. In a T-junction, droplet size and formation rate are determined by the flow rate ratio and capillary number. The capillary number relates the viscosity of the continuous phase, the superficial velocity of the continuous phase, and the interfacial tension. Typically, the dispersed phase flow rate is slower than the continuous flow rate. T-junction formation can be further applied by adding additional channels, creating two T-junctions at one location. By adding channels, different dispersed phases can be added at the same point to create alternating droplets of different compositions. Droplet size, usually above 10 μm, is limited by the channel dimensions and often produces droplets with a CV of less than 2% with a rate of up to 7 kHz.

=== Flow focusing droplet formation ===
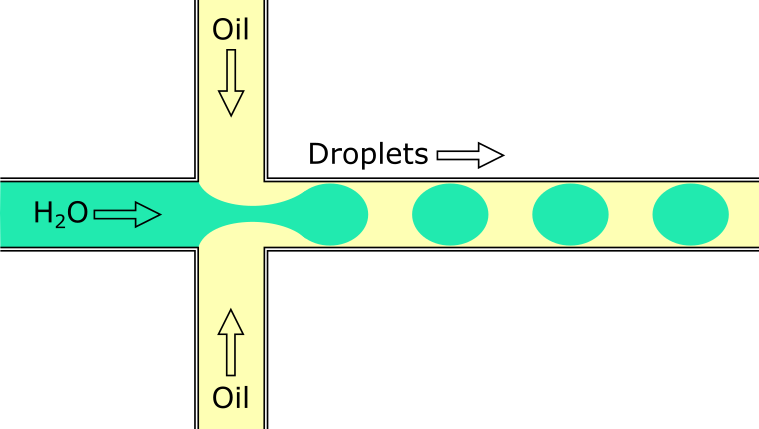
Droplet formation using a flow focusing device.

Diagram of flow focusing droplet formation device commonly used in microfluidic devices. Liquid flowing in from the left is pinched off into droplets by an oil flowing in from the top and bottom.

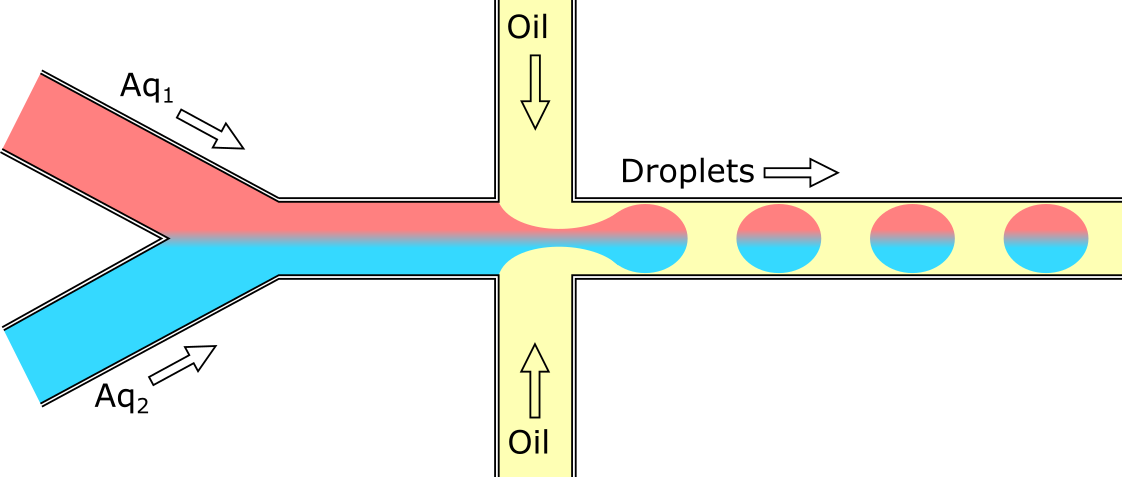
Two stream reagent addition using a flow focusing approach with a planar chip format.

Flow focusing is a usually passive formation method that involves the dispersed phase flowing to meet the continuous phase typically at an angle (nonparallel streams) then undergoing a constraint that creates a droplet. This constraint is generally a narrowing in the channel to create the droplet though symmetric shearing, followed by a channel of equal or greater width. As with cross-flowing, the continuous phase flow rate is typically higher than the dispersed phase flow rate. Decreasing the flow of the continuous phase can increase the size of the droplets. Flow focusing can also be an active method with the constraint point being adjustable using pneumatic side chambers controlled by compressed air. The movable chambers act to pinch the flow, deforming the stream and creating a droplet with a changeable driving frequency. Droplet size is usually around several hundred nanometers with a CV of less than 3% and a rate of up to several hundred Hz to tens of kHz.

=== Co-flowing droplet formation ===
Co-flowing is a passive droplet formation method where the dispersed phase channel is enclosed inside a continuous phase channel. At the end of the dispersed phase channel, the fluid is stretched until it breaks from shear forces and forms droplets either by dripping or jetting. Dripping occurs when capillary forces dominate the system and droplets are created at the channel endpoint. Jetting occurs, by widening or stretching, when the continuous phase is moving slower, creating a stream from the dispersed phase channel opening. Under the widening regime, the dispersed phase is moving faster than the continuous phase causing a deceleration of the dispersed phase, widening the droplet and increasing the diameter. Under the stretching regime, viscous drag dominates causing the stream to narrow creating a smaller droplet. The effect of the continuous phase flow rate on the droplet size depends on whether the system is in a stretching or widening regime thus different equations must be used to predict droplet size. Droplet size is usually around several hundred nanometers with a CV of less than 5% and a rate of up to tens of kHz.

== Droplet manipulation ==
The benefits of microfluidics can be scaled up to higher throughput using larger channels to allow more droplets to pass or by increasing droplet size. Droplet size can be tuned by adjusting the rate of flow of the continuous and disperse phases, but droplet size is limited by the need to maintain the concentration, inter-analyte distances, and stability of microdroplets. Thus, increased channel size becomes attractive due to the ability to create and transport a large number of droplets, though dispersion and stability of droplets become a concern. Finally, thorough mixing of droplets to expose the greatest possible number of reagents is necessary to ensure the maximum amount of starting materials react. This can be accomplished by using a windy channel to facilitate unsteady laminar flow within the droplets.

=== Surfactants ===
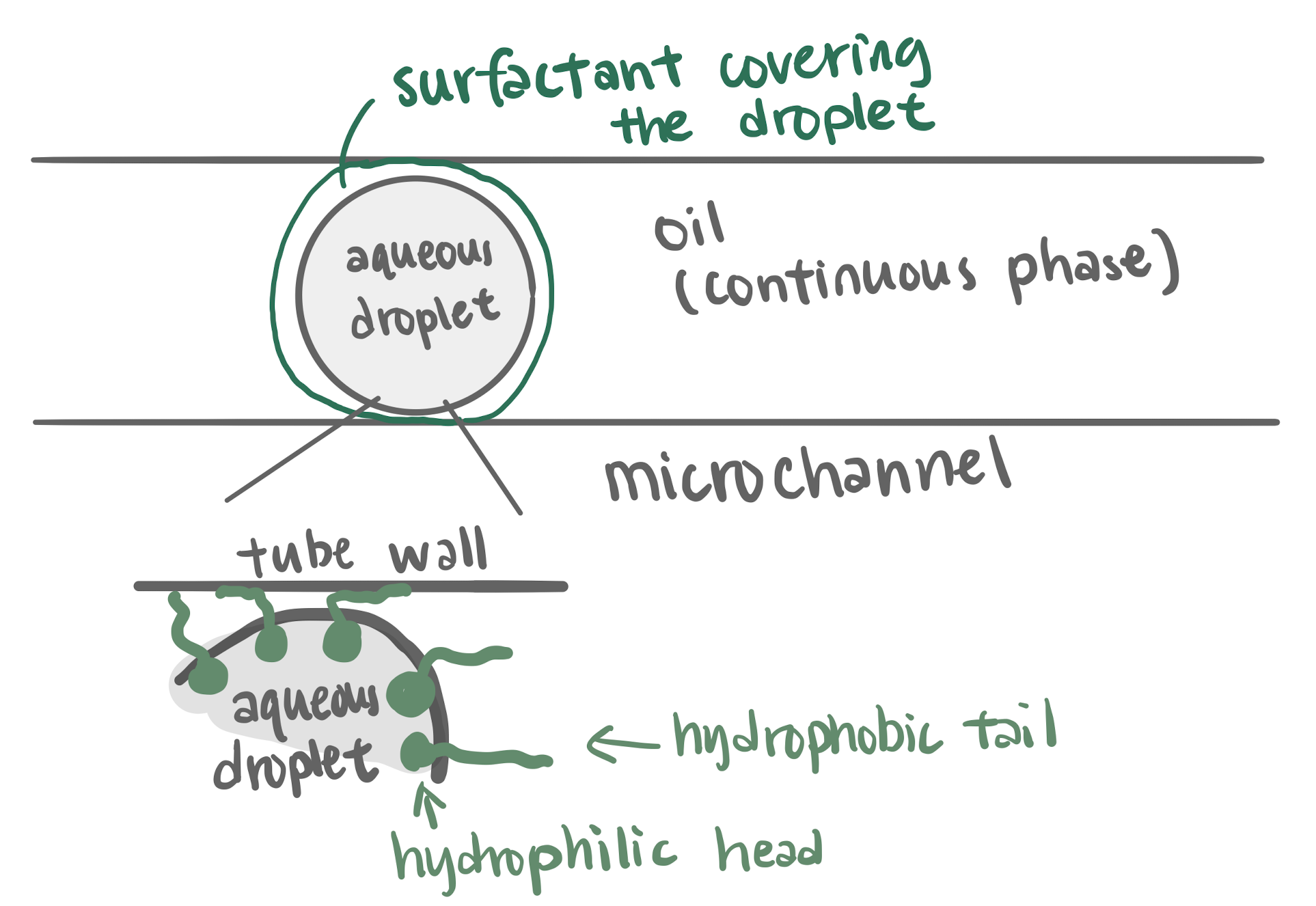
The surfactant stabilizes the interface between the continuous oil phase and the aqueous droplet. Also, the surfactants can reduce the adhesion of aqueous droplets to the channel wall, by decreasing the surface tension at the aqueous-oil interface.

Surfactants play an important role in droplet-based microfluidics. The main purpose of using a surfactant is to reduce the interfacial tension between the dispersed phase (droplet phase, typically aqueous) and continuous phase (carrier liquid, typically oil) by adsorbing at interfaces and preventing droplets from coalescing with each other, therefore stabilizing the droplets in a stable emulsion state, which allows for longer storage times in delay-lines, reservoirs, or vials. Without using surfactants, the unstable emulsions will eventually evolve into separate phases to reduce the overall energy of the system. Surface chemistry cannot be ignored in microfluidics as the interfacial tension becomes a major consideration among microscale droplets. Linas Mazutis and Andrew D. Griffiths presented a method that used surfactants to achieve a selective and highly controllable coalescence without external manipulation. They manipulate the contact time and the interfacial surfactant coverage of a drop pair to control droplet fusion. The larger the difference percentage of the interfacial surfactant coverage between two droplets, the less likely coalescence will occur. This method allowed researchers to add reagents to droplets in a different way and further study the emulsification.

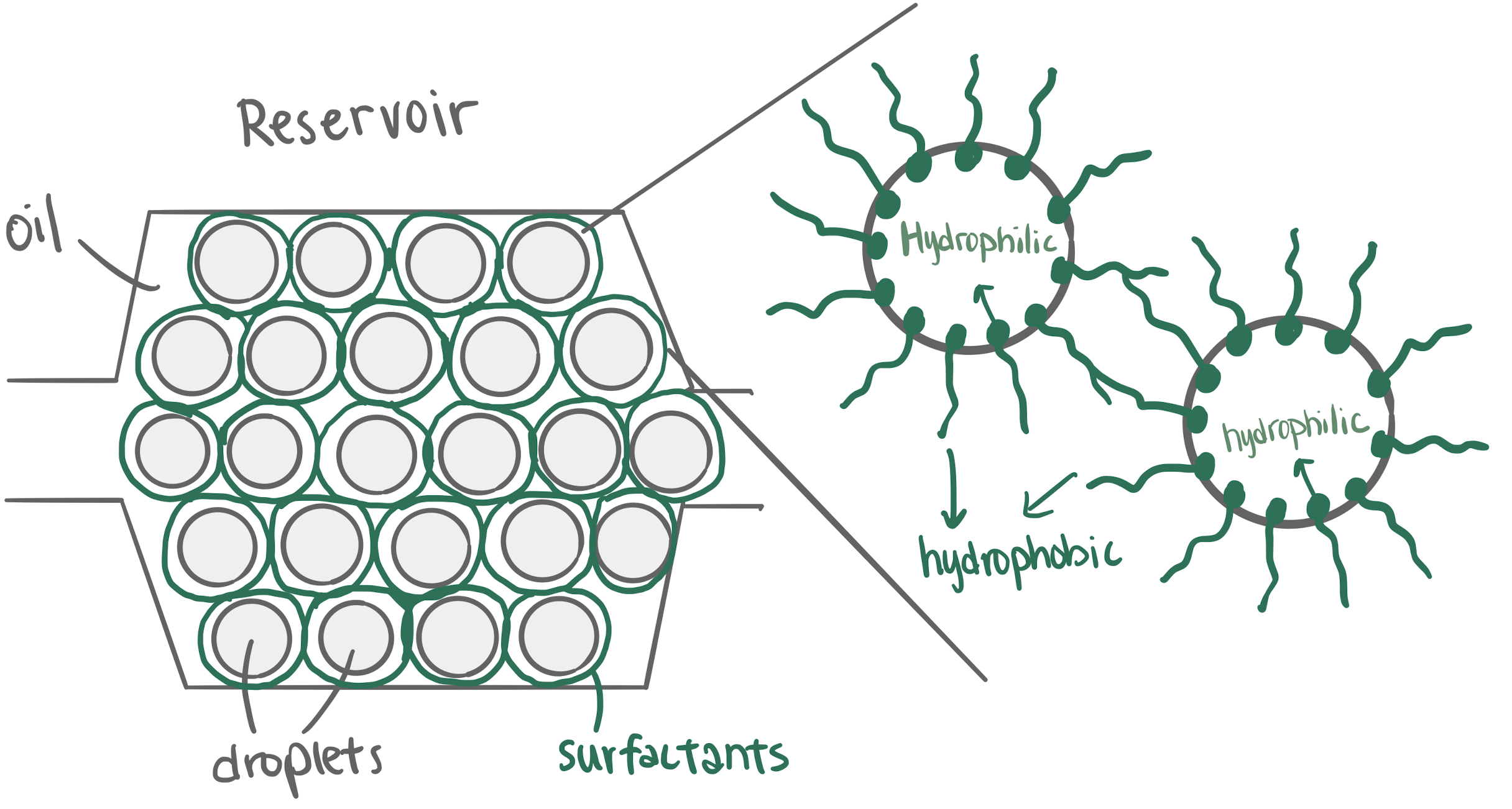
The hydrophobic tails on the surfactant keep the emulsion stable and prevent droplet coalescence together during the incubation time. The larger/longer the hydrophobic tails are, the better the biocompatibility and the better the solubility in oil phase, also the better the insolubility in aqueous phase.

Microfluidics is widely used for biochemical experiments, so it is important that surfactants are biocompatible when working with living cells and high-throughput analysis. Surfactants used in living cell research devices should not interfere with biochemical reactions or cellular functions. Hydrocarbon oil is typically not used in cell microfluidic research because it is not compatible with cells and damages cell viability. Hydrocarbon oil also extracts organic molecules from the aqueous phase. However, fluorosurfactants with fluorinated tails, for example, are used as a compatible droplet emulsifier that stabilizes droplets containing cells inside without harming or altering the cells. Fluorosurfactants are soluble in a fluorinated oil (continuous phase) but insoluble in the aqueous phase, which results in decreasing the aqueous-fluorous interfacial tension. For example, a triblock copolymer surfactant containing two perfluoropolyether (PFPE) tails and a polyethylene glycol (PEG) block head group is a fluorosurfactant with great biocompatibility and excellent droplet stability against coalescence. Another example are the fluorinated linear polyglycerols, which can be further functionalized on their tailored side-chains and are more customizable compared to the PEG-based copolymer. Surfactants can be purchased from many chemical companies, such as RainDance Technologies (now through BioRad) and Miller-Stephenson.

==== Physical considerations ====
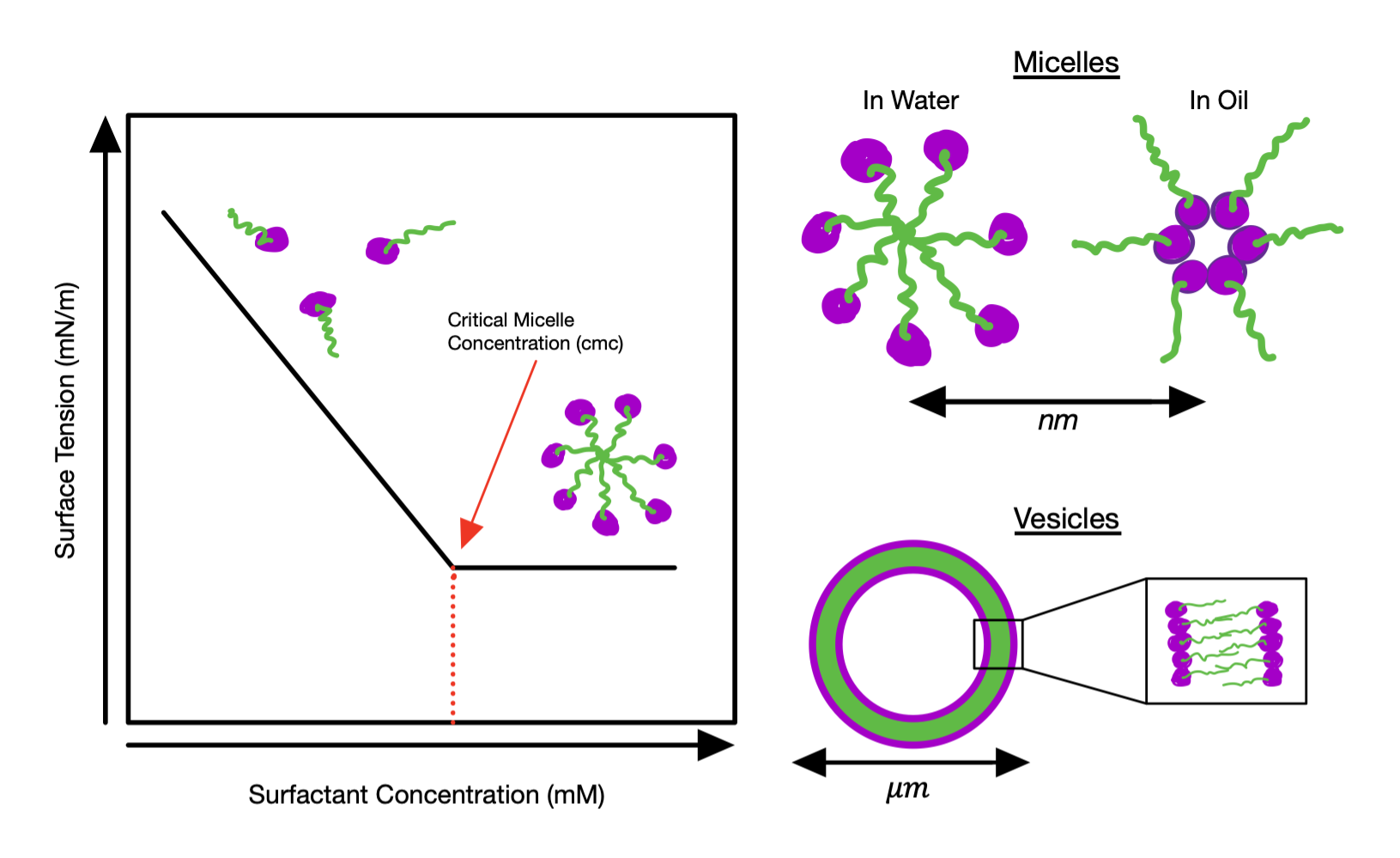
Simplified Gibbs adsorption isotherm visualization- displaying model Critical Micelle Concentration (left). Simplified micelle and vesicle structure, with size ranges (right).

Upon addition of surfactants or inorganic salts to a droplet-based microfluidic system, the interfacial tension of individual droplets alters within the microfluidic system. These separatory components allow for the utilization of the droplets as microreactors for various procedural mechanisms. In order to describe the relationship between interfacial tension (), concentration of dissociated surfactants/salts in the bulk droplet (C), Temperature (T), the Boltzmann constant (k_{B}), and the concentration of dissociated surfactants/salts at the interface (Γ), the Gibbs adsorption isotherm was created, a simplified section highlighting relevant information displayed to the right.

This isotherm reaffirms the notion that while the inorganic salt concentration increases, salts are depleted from the droplet interface (Γ<0), and the interface tension of the droplet increases. This is contrasted by surfactants, which adsorb at the interface (Γ>0), and lower interfacial tension. At low surfactant concentrations, surface tension decreases according to the Gibbs adsorption isotherm, until a certain concentration is reached, known as the critical micelle concentration (CMC), when micelles begin to form. Upon reaching the CMC, the dissolved surfactant concentration reaches a maximum, where the surfactant monomers will aggregate to form nanometer sized micelles. Due to this potential for micelle formation, three steps can be utilized when analyzing the adsorption of the surfactants to the droplet's interface. First, the surfactant molecules adsorb between the surface layer and the subsurface layer. Second, the molecules exchange between the subsurface and the bulk solution. Third, the micelles relax, caused by the breaking of equilibrium between free molecules and micelles.

The molecules making up each micelle are organized depending on the solution they are suspended in, with the more soluble portions in contact with the solution, and the less soluble portions of the molecule in contact with each other. Depending on the ratio of volume of the polar heads and nonpolar tail, various surfactants have been found to form larger aggregates, hollow, bi-layered structures known as vesicles. A notable surfactant that has been witnessed to form vesicles is AOT (Dioctyl sulfosuccinate sodium salt). These micelles and vesicles are relatively new discoveries; however, they have been utilized to transport agents within microfluidic systems, revealing future applications for microfluidic transports.

=== Reagent addition ===
Microscale reactions performed in droplet-based applications conserve reagents and reduce reaction time all at kilohertz rates. Reagent addition to droplet microreactors has been a focus of research due to the difficulty of achieving reproducible additions at kilohertz rates without droplet-to-droplet contamination.

==== Reagent coflow prior to droplet formation ====
Reagents can be added at the time of droplet formation through a "co-flow" geometry. Reagent streams are pumped in separate channels and join at the interface with a channel containing the continuous phase, which shears and creates droplets containing both reagents. By changing the flow rates in reagent channels, reagent ratios within a droplet can be controlled.

==== Droplet fusion ====
Controlled electrocoalesence of two droplets. A smaller droplet flows faster than a larger one, catching up to the larger droplet. Upon application of an electric field, as the droplet pair flows through the electrodes, the droplets fuse.

The fusion of droplets with different contents can also be exploited for reagent addition. Electro-coalescence merges pairs of droplets by applying an electric field to temporarily destabilize the droplet-droplet interface to achieve reproducible droplet fusion in surfactant-stabilized emulsions. Electro-coalescence requires droplets (which are normally separated by the continuous phase) to come into contact. By manipulating droplet size in separate streams, differential flow of droplet sizes can bring droplets into contact before merging.

Another method for facilitating droplet fusion is acoustic tweezing. While droplets are flowing in microfluidic channels, they can be immobilised using an acoustic tweezer based on surface acoustic waves. Once a droplet is held with the acoustic tweezer, consecutive droplets collide into it and fusion takes place.

Two droplets come together in this device. The pillars divide the flow into three channels: two side branches on the top and bottom, and a middle branch, through which the entire merged droplet flows to. The continuous phase between adjacent droplets is effectively filtered out by being allowed to flow through the top and bottom branches. The removal of the continuous phase between droplets facilitates droplet fusion.

==== Injection of reagents into existing droplets ====
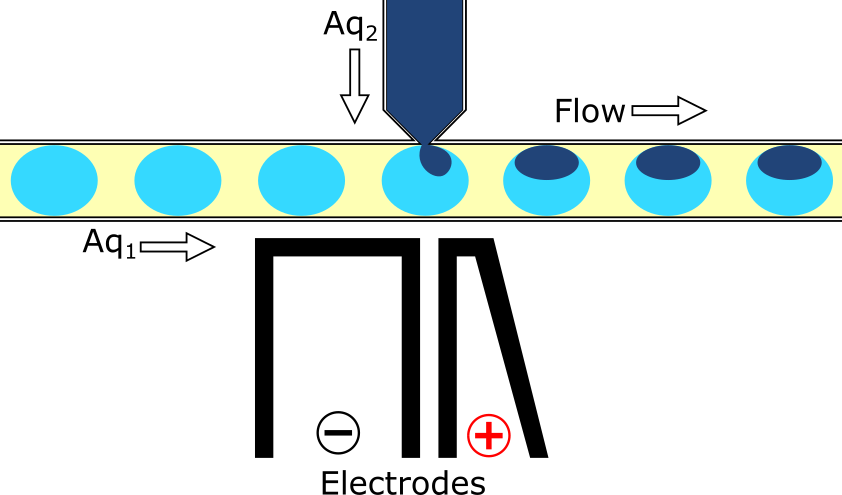
Picoinjection reagent addition method, showing the addition of aqueous fluid (Aq_{2} – dark blue), into previously formed droplets (Aq_{1} – light blue) flowing through a channel.

Reagent co-flow and droplet fusion methods are tied to droplet formation events which lack downstream flexibility. To decouple reagent addition from droplet creation, a setup where reagent stream flows through a channel perpendicular to the droplet stream is utilized. An injection droplet is then merged with the plug as it passes the channel. Reagent volume is controlled by the flow rate of the perpendicular reagent channel.

An early challenge for such systems is that reagent droplet merging was not reproducible for stable emulsions. By adapting the use of an actuated electric field into this geometry, Abate et al. achieved sub-picoliter control of reagent injection. This approach, termed picoinjection, controls injection volume through reagent stream pressure and droplet velocity. Further work on this method has aimed to reduce pressure fluctuations that impede reproducible injections.

Injection of the pressurized aqueous fluid occurs when the electrodes are activated creating an electric field that destabilizes the aqueous fluid/oil interface, triggering the injection. Key advantages of picoinjection include low inadvertent material transfer between droplets and maintenance of droplet compartmentalization through the injection, however, electrodes are often fabricated using metal-solder which can complicate construction of the microfluidic device through increased fabrication time as a result of a more intricate design. An alternative picoinjection method involves utilizing the injection reagent as the conductor of an electric field where a voltage applied to the fluid stimulates injection. Such a method also allows for greater control of injection as the voltage applied corresponds to the volume of reagent fluid injected.

Droplet-to-droplet contamination is a challenge of many injection methods. To combat this, Doonan et al. developed a multifunctional K-channel, which flows reagent streams opposite the path of the droplet stream. Utilizing an interface between the two channels, injection is achieved similarly to picoinjection, but any bilateral contamination washed away through continuous reagent flow. Contamination is avoided at the expense of potentially wasting precious reagent.

=== Droplet incubation ===
In order to make droplet-based microfluidics a viable technique for carrying out chemical reactions or working with living cells on the microscale, it is necessary to implement methods allowing for droplet incubation. Chemical reactions often need time to occur, and living cells similarly require time to grow, multiply, and carry out metabolic processes. Droplet incubation can be accomplished either within the device itself (on-chip) or externally (off-chip), depending on the parameters of the system. Off-chip incubation is useful for incubation times of a day or more or for incubation of millions of droplets at a time. On-chip incubation allows for integration of droplet manipulation and detection steps in a single device.

==== Off-chip incubation ====
Droplets containing cells can be stored off-chip in PTFE tubing for up to several days while maintaining cell viability and allowing for reinjection onto another device for analysis. Evaporation of aqueous and oil-based fluids has been reported with droplet storage in PTFE tubing, so for storage longer than several days, glass capillaries are also used. Finally, following formation in a microfluidic device, droplets may also be guided through a system of capillaries and tubing leading to a syringe. Droplets can be incubated in the syringe and then directly injected onto another chip for further manipulation or detection and analysis.

==== On-chip incubation ====
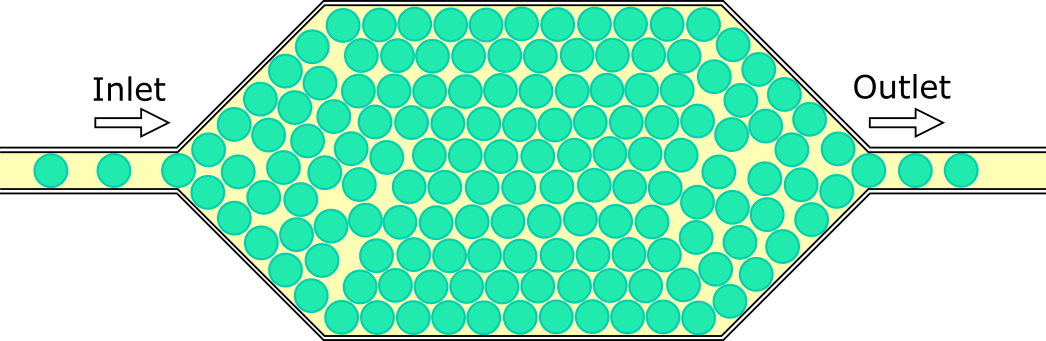
On-chip reservoir designed to house droplets for longer term storage.

Delay lines are used to incubate droplets on-chip. After formation, droplets can be introduced into a serpentine channel with length of up to a meter or more. Increasing the depth and width of the delay line channel (as compared to channels used to form and transport droplets) enables longer incubation times while minimizing channel back pressure. Because of the larger channel size, droplets fill up the delay line channel and incubate in the time it takes the droplets to traverse this channel.

Delay lines were originally designed for incubating droplets containing chemical reaction mixtures and were capable of achieving delay times of up to one hour. These devices make use of delay line channels tens of centimeters in length. Increasing the total length of the delay line channels to one or more meters made incubation times of 12 or more hours possible. Delay lines have been shown to maintain droplet stability for up to 3 days, and cell viability has been demonstrated using on-chip delay lines for up to 12 hours. Prior to the development of delay lines, on-chip incubation was performed by directing droplets into large reservoirs (several millimeters in both length and width), which offers high storage capacity and lower complexity of device construction and operation if precise time control of droplets is not required.

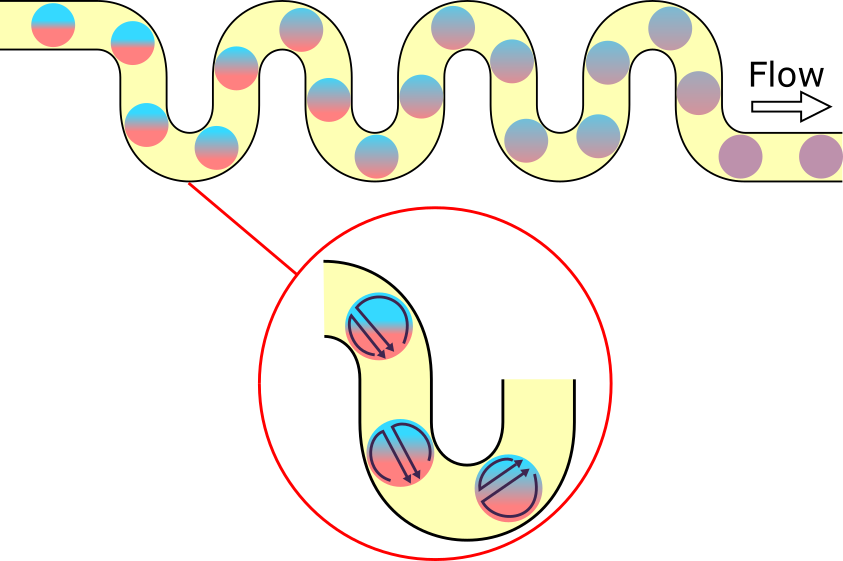
Mixing by chaotic advection in a winding channel. As the droplets proceed in the winding channel, unsteady fluid flow is caused by co- and counter-rotating vortices (see inset).

If it is important to have a uniform distribution of incubation times for the droplets, the delay line channel may contain regularly spaced constrictions. Droplets flowing through a channel of uniform diameter travel at different speeds based on their radial position; droplets closer to the center of the channel move faster than those near the edges. By narrowing the channel width to a fraction of its original size, droplets with higher velocities are forced to equilibrate with slower-moving droplets because the constriction allows fewer droplets to pass through at a time. Another manipulation to the geometry of the delay line channel involves introducing turns to the droplets' trajectory. This increases the extent to which any reagents contained within the droplets are mixed via chaotic advection. For systems requiring the incubation of 100 to 1000 droplets, traps can be fabricated in the delay line channel that store droplets separately from one another. This provides for finer control and monitoring of individual droplets.

=== Magnetic droplets ===
The micro-magnetofluidic method is the control of magnetic fluids by an applied magnetic field on a microfluidic platform, offering wireless and programmable control of the magnetic droplets. Hence, the magnetic force can also be used to perform various logical operations, in addition to the hydrodynamic force and the surface tension force. The magnetic field strength, type of the magnetic field (gradient, uniform or rotating), magnetic susceptibility, interfacial tension, flow rates, and flow rate ratios determine the control of the droplets on a micro-magnetofluidic platform.

Magnetic droplets, in the context of droplet-based microfluidics, are microliter size droplets that are either composed of ferrofluids or contain some magnetic component that allows for manipulation via an applied magnetic field. Ferrofluids are homogenous mixtures of colloidal solutions of magnetic nanoparticles in a liquid carrier. Two applications of magnetic droplets are the control and manipulation of microfluidic droplets in a microenvironment and the fabrication, transport, and utilization of nanomaterial constructs in the microdroplets. Manipulating magnetic droplets can be used to perform tasks such as arranging droplets into an ordered array for applications in cell culture studies, while the use of magnetic droplets for nanostructure fabrication can be used in drug delivery applications.

==== Magnetic droplets in non-traditional systems ====
In traditional, droplet-based microfluidic systems, that is to say, a droplet in a channel which contains an immiscible oil that separates the droplets, movement of the droplets is achieved through differences in pressure or surface tension. In non-traditional, droplet-based microfluidic systems, such as those herein, other mechanisms of control are needed to manipulate the droplets. Application of a magnetic field to a microfluid array containing magnetic droplets allows for easily achieved sorting and arrangement of the droplets into useful patterns and configurations. These types of manipulations can be achieved via static or dynamic application of a magnetic field which allows for a high degree of control over magnetic droplets. Characterization of the degree of control over magnetic droplets includes measurements of the magnetic susceptibility of the ferrofluid, measurement of the change in droplet in substrate interface area in the presence of an applied magnetic field, and measurement of the "roll-off angle" or the angle at which the droplet would move in the presence of a magnetic field when the surface was tilted. Interactions between the water droplet and the surface can be manipulated by adjusting the structure of the microfluidic system itself by applying a magnetic field to iron-doped poly[dimethylsiloxane] (PDMS), a common material for microfluidic devices.

In other systems considered non-traditional, droplet-based microfluidic system, magnetic microdroplets can be a facile means of fabrication and control of micro and nanomaterials, sometimes called "robots". These nanostructures are formed of magnetic nanoparticles in microdroplets that have been manipulated into specific structures by an applied magnetic field. Microhelices are a multifunctional application of this technology. Monodisperse droplets containing magnetic nanoparticles are generated and subjected to a magnetic field which organizes the nanoparticles into a helical template that is fabricated in place through photoinduced polymerization. These microhelices were shown to be effective at clearing channels that were blocked with semi-solid composites of fats, oils, and proteins, such as those found in arteries. Microhelices and microparticle clusters in magnetic droplets have been demonstrated to be a means of transport for small (500 μm diameter) microparticles, showing applications in drug delivery as well. Non-spherical microstructures have also been fabricated using magnetic microfluidics, demonstrating the minute control that is available. Among the non-spherical microstructures to be fabricated were graphene oxide microcapsules that could be aspirated and reinflated using a micropipette, while also exhibiting photoresponsive and magnetoresponsive behavior. Microcapsules that respond to magnetic and photo stimuli, such as these constructed of graphene oxide, are useful for biomedical applications that require in vivo, contact-free manipulation of cellular structures such as stem cells.

==== Droplet sorting ====
Droplet sorting in microfluidics is an important technique, allowing for discrimination based on factors ranging from droplet size to chemicals labeled with fluorescent tags within the droplet, stemming off of the work done to sort cells in Flow Cytometry. Within the realm of droplet sorting there are two main types, bulk sorting, which uses either active or passive methods, and precise sorting, which relies mainly on active methods. Bulk sorting is applied to samples with a large number of droplets (> 2000 s^{−1}) that can be sorted based on intrinsic properties of the droplets (such as viscosity, density, etc.) without checking each droplet. Precise sorting, on the other hand, aims to separate droplets that meet certain criteria that is checked on each droplet.

Passive sorting is done through control of the microfluidic channel design, allowing for discrimination based on droplet size. Size sorting relies on the bifurcating junctions in the channel to divert the flow, which causes droplets to sort based on how they interact with the cross section of that flow, the shear rate, which relates directly to their size. Other passive methods include inertia and microfiltration, each having to do with the physical properties, such as inertia, and density, of the droplet. Active sorting uses additional devices attached to the microfluidic device to alter the path of a droplet during flow by controlling some aspect, including thermal, magnetic, pneumatic, acoustic, hydrodynamic and electric control. These controls are utilized to sort the droplets in response to some signal detection from the droplets such as fluorescence intensity.

Precise sorting methods utilize these active sorting methods by first making a decision (e.g., fluorescence signal) about the droplets then altering their flow with one of the aforementioned methods. A technique called Fluorescent Activated Droplet Sorting (FADS) has been developed which utilizes electric field-induced active sorting with fluorescent detection to sort up to 2000 droplets per second. The method relies on, but is not limited to, enzymatic activity of compartmentalized target cells to activate a fluorogenic substrate within the droplet. When a fluorescing droplet is detected, two electrodes are switched on applying a field to the droplet, which shifts its course into the selection channel, while non-fluorescing droplets flow through the main channel to waste. Other methods utilize different selection criteria, such as absorbance or transmittance of droplet, number of encapsulated particles, or image recognition of cell shapes. Sorting can be done to improve encapsulation purity, an important factor for collecting sample for further experiments.

== Key applications ==
=== Cell culture ===
One of the key advantages of droplet-based microfluidics is the ability to use droplets as incubators for single cells. In addition, droplets can be applied for studies on embryogenesis of animals and plants.

Devices capable of generating thousands of droplets per second open new ways to characterize cell populations, not only based on a specific marker measured at a specific time point but also based on cells' kinetic behavior such as protein secretion, enzyme activity or proliferation. Recently, a method was found to generate a stationary array of microscopic droplets for single-cell incubation that does not require the use of a surfactant.

==== Cell culture using droplet-based microfluidics ====
Droplet-based microfluidic systems provide an analytic platform that enables the isolation of single cells or groups of cells in droplets. This tool offers high-throughput for cell experiments since droplet-based microfluidic systems can generate thousands of samples (droplets) per second. Compared with cell culture in conventional microtiter plates, microdroplets from μL to pL volumes reduce the use of reagents and cells. Additionally, automated handling and continuous processing allow assays to be carried out more efficiently. The isolated environment in an encapsulated droplet helps analyze each individual cell population. High-throughput cell culture experiments, for example, testing the behavior of bacteria, finding rare cell types, directed evolution, and cell screening are suitable for using the droplet-based microfluidic techniques.

==== Materials, incubation and viability ====
Polydimethylsiloxane (PDMS) is the most common material to fabricate microfluidic devices due to low cost, ease of prototyping, and good gas permeability. Along with perfluorocarbon carrier oils, which also allow good gas permeability, used as a continuous phase in the droplet-based microfluidic system for cell culture, some studies have found that cell viability is comparable to culture in flasks, for example mammalian cells. To reach the required culture time, a reservoir or a delay line can be used. Using a reservoir allows long-term culture from several hours to several days while the delay line is suitable for short-term culture with several minutes. Incubation is feasible both on-chip (reservoir connected with a microfluidic system or delay lines) and off-chip (PTFE tubing isolated with a microfluidic system) after the droplets formed. After incubation, droplets can be reinjected into the microfluidic device for analysis. There are also specially designed on-chip droplet storage systems for direct analysis, such as the "dropspot" device, which stores droplets in several array chambers and uses microarray scanner for direct analysis.

==== Challenges ====
Cell culture using droplet-based microfluidics has created many opportunities for research that is inaccessible in conventional platforms, but also has many challenges. Some of the challenges of cell culture in droplet-based microfluidics are common to other microfluidic culture system. First, nutrient consumption should be re-evaluated for a specific microfluid system. For example, glucose consumption is sometimes increased in microfluidic systems (depending on the cell type). The medium turnover is sometimes faster than in macroscopic culture due to reduced culture volumes, thus the volumes of the medium used must be adjusted in each cell line and device. Secondly, the cellular proliferation and behavior may differ depending on the microfluidic systems, a determining factor is the culture surface area to media volume, which vary from one device to another. One report found that proliferation was impaired in the microchannels; increased glucose or serum supplementation did not address the problem for his specific case. Thirdly, the pH regulation must be controlled. PDMS is more permeable to CO_{2} than to O_{2} or N_{2}, thus, the dissolved gas level during incubation should be adjusted to reach the expected pH condition.

=== Biological macromolecule characterization ===
==== Protein crystallization ====
Droplet-based devices have also been used to investigate the conditions necessary for protein crystallization.

==== Droplet-based PCR ====
Polymerase chain reaction (PCR) has been a vital tool in genomics and biological endeavors since its inception as it has greatly sped up production and analysis of DNA samples for a wide range of applications. The technological advancement of microdroplet scale PCR has enabled the construction of single-molecule PCR-on-a-chip device. Early single molecule DNA replication, including what occurs in microdroplet or emulsion PCR, was more difficult than larger scale PCR so much higher concentrations of components were usually used. However, fully optimized conditions have minimized this overload by insuring single molecules have an appropriate concentration of replication components distributed throughout the reaction cell. Non-droplet based microfluidic PCR also faces challenges with reagent absorption into the device channels, but droplet-based systems lessen this problem with decreased channel contact.

Using water-in-oil systems, droplet PCR operates by assembling ingredients, forming droplets, combining droplets, thermocycling, and then processing results much like normal PCR. This technique is capable of running in excess of 2 million PCR reactions in addition to a 100,000-fold increase in the detection of wild-type alleles over mutant alleles. Droplet-based PCR greatly increases the multiplexing capabilities of normal PCR – allowing for fast production of mutation libraries. Without proofreading, DNA replication is inherently somewhat error-prone, but by introducing error-prone polymerases, droplet-based PCR utilizes higher than normal mutation output to build a mutation library more quickly and efficiently than normal. This makes droplet-based PCR more attractive than slower, traditional PCR. In a similar application, highly multiplexed, microdroplet PCR has been developed that allows for the screening of large numbers of target sequences enabling applications such as bacterial identification. On-chip PCR allows for an excess of 15 x 15 multiplexing, which means that multiple target DNA sequences could be run on the same device at the same time. This multiplexing was made possible with immobilized DNA primer fragments placed in the base of the individual wells of the chips.

Combining droplet-based PCR with polydimethylsiloxane (PDMS) devices has allowed for novel enhancements of droplet PCR as well as remedying some preexisting problems with droplet PCR including high liquid loss due to evaporation. Droplet-based PCR is highly sensitive to air bubbles as they create temperature differentials hindering DNA replication while also dislodging reagents from the replication chamber. Now, droplet-based PCR has been carried out in PDMS devices to transfer reagents into droplets through a PDMS layer in a more controlled manner that better maintains replication progress and stability than traditional valves. A recent droplet-PCR PDMS device allowed for higher accuracy and amplification of small copy numbers in comparison to traditional quantitative PCR experiments. This higher accuracy was due to surfactant-doped PDMS as well as a sandwiched glass-PDMS-glass device design. These device properties have allowed for more streamlined priming of DNA and less water evaporation during PCR cycling.

==== DNA sequencing ====
Multiple microfluidic systems, including droplet-based systems, have been used for DNA sequencing.

=== Directed evolution ===
Directed evolution of an enzyme is a repetitive process of creating random genetic mutations, screening for a target phenotype, and selecting the most robust variant(s) for further modification. The ability of humankind to use directed evolution to optimize enzymes for biotechnological purposes is largely limited by the throughput of screening tools and methods and the simplicity of their use. Due to the iterative nature of directed evolution and the necessity for large libraries, directed evolution at the macroscale can be a costly endeavor. As such, performing experiments at the microscale through droplet-based microfluidics provides a significantly cheaper alternative to macroscopic equivalents. Various approaches price the directed evolution through droplet microfluidics under $40 for a screen of a 10^{6}–10^{7} sized gene library, while the corresponding macroscale experiment is priced at approximately $15 million. Additionally, with screening times that range from 300 to 2000 droplets sorted per second, droplet-based microfluidics provides a platform for significantly accelerated library screening such that gene libraries of 10^{7} can be sorted well within a day. Droplet-based microfluidic devices make directed evolution accessible and cost effective.

Many different approaches to device construction of droplet-based microfluidic devices have been developed for directed evolution in order to have the capacity to screen a vast variety of different proteins, pathways, and genomes. One method of feeding libraries into the microfluidic device uses single cell encapsulation, in which droplets contain a maximum of one cell each. This avoids confounding results that could be generated by having multiple cells, and consequently multiple genotypes, in a single droplet, while maximizing the efficiency of resource consumption. This method enables the detection of secreted proteins and proteins on the cell membrane. The addition of a cell lysate to the droplets, which breaks down the cellular membrane such that the intracellular species are freely available within the droplet, expands the capabilities of the single cell encapsulation method to analyze intracellular proteins. The library can also be made entirely in vitro (i.e., not in its biological/cellular context) such that the content of the droplet is exclusively a mutated DNA strand. The in vitro system requires PCR and the use of in vitro transcription and translation (IVTT) systems to generate the desired protein in the droplet for analysis. Sorting of droplets for directed evolution is primarily done by fluorescence detection (e.g., fluorescence-activated droplet sorting (FADS)), however recent developments in a absorbance-based sorting methods, known as absorbance-activated droplet sorting (AADS), have expanded the diversity of substrates that can undergo directed evolution through a droplet-based microfluidic device. Recently, sorting capability has even expanded to the detection of NADPH levels and has been used to create higher activity NADP-dependent oxidoreductases. Ultimately, the potential for different methods of droplet creation and analysis in directed evolution droplet-based microfluidic devices allows for a variability that facilitates a large population of potential candidates for directed evolution.

As a method for protein engineering, directed evolution has many applications in fields from development of drugs and vaccines to the synthesis of food and chemicals. A microfluidic device was developed to identify improved enzyme production hosts (i.e., cell factories) that can be employed industrially in various fields. An artificial aldolase was further enhanced by 30-fold using droplet-based microfluidics so that its activity resembled that of naturally occurring proteins. More recently, the creation of functional oxidases has been enabled by a novel microfluidic device created by Debon et al. The droplet-based microfluidic approach to the directed evolution has a great potential for the development of a myriad of novel proteins.

==== Recent advances ====
Since the early 2000s, advances in droplet-based microfluidics have made it a powerful technique for conducting directed evolution campaigns. Early developments in bulk production of single-emulsions (SEs; e.g. "water-in-oil" droplets) and double-emulsions (DEs; e.g. "water-in-oil-in-water" droplets) were followed by innovations in on-chip formation and sorting of SEs and DEs, which allow for greater ease and throughput of directed evolution experiments on microfluidic chips.

An essential component of directed evolution is the maintenance of the linkage between enzymatic genotypes and phenotypes. The ability to form DEs on-chip and subsequently sort using fluorescence-activated cell sorting (FACS) pushed the field forward. In 2013, Yan et al. showed the use of FACS to sort DEs. In 2014, Zinchenko et al. published a system to formulate monodisperse DEs and to sort and quantitatively analyze them using a commercially available flow cytometer. The authors demonstrated the power of their system by enriching an active wild-type arylsulfatase from populations of 0.1% and 0.01% active cells by 800- to 2500-fold, respectively. In 2016, Larsen et al. developed a fluorescence-based optical sorting system to monitor polymerases activity inside a microfluidic device. Using their system, Larsen and colleagues showed approximately 1200-fold enrichment of an engineered polymerase. After one round of selection of an alpha-L-threofuranosyl nucleic acid (TNA) polymerase, they demonstrated roughly 14-fold improvement in activity and >99% correct placement of residues in a growing polypeptide. In 2017, S. S. Terekhov et al. developed monodisperse microfluidic double water-in-oil-in-water emulsion (MDE) sorting, which they combined with FACS followed by liquid chromatography-mass spectrometry (LC-MS) and next-generation sequencing (NGS). The authors demonstrated high sensitivity sorting of enzymatically active yeast cells from non-active cells using fluorescence. Further, they showed the ability of their MDE-FACS system to interrogate interactions between target and effector cells within droplets without interference from other yeast and bacterial cells.

Rather than developing new platforms, some groups have focused on the optimization of existing methods, tools and platforms to simplify and improve their ease of use by non-experts. In 2017, Sukovitch et al.created a system to produce monodisperse or approximately equal size DEs by cutting out the coating process required for DE chips. Various groups have altered surfactant types and concentrations to simplify reagent delivery in SEs and DEs. In 2018, Ma et al. presented a dual-channel microfluidic droplet screening system (DMDS). The system uses fluorogenic tags to sort SEs by two different properties of a target enzyme at the same time. Using DMDS, Ma and coworkers directed the evolution of a highly enantioselective esterase using multiple enzymatic properties. In 2020, Brower et al. demonstrated DE sorting and isolation on-chip followed by FACS that allows for high sorting throughput of encapsulated mammalian cells, from which genetic material can later be extracted.

While fluorogenic labeling is a powerful tool for tracking and sorting, it is not always compatible with droplet-based microfluidic systems and experimental design. New label-free and non-fluorescence-based detection techniques have recently been reported. In 2016, Gielen et al. published an absorbance-activated droplet sorting (AADS) microfluidic device and demonstrated its functionality by directing the evolution of a phenylalanine dehydrogenase. In 2016, Sun et al. demonstrated the use of SE droplets and high-throughput MS to screen enzyme activators and inhibitors by screening a transaminase library. In 2019, Pan et al. showed sorting of droplets by interfacial tensions, which are affected by droplet content. In 2020, Haidas et al. presented a microfluidic approach that uses both matrix-assisted laser desorption ionization mass spectrometry (MALDI-MS) and fluorescence microscopy, which the authors used to measure the concentration and activity of phytase, respectively, in yeast cells. In 2020, Holland-Moritz et al. published their mass activated droplet sorting (MADS) method, which integrates MS analysis with fluorescence-activated droplet sorting (FADS). Using this method, droplets are split and analyzed separately by both MS and FADS. The power of this method was demonstrated by screening the activity of a transaminase library expressed in vitro.

Experts anticipate that future microfluidic-based innovations for directed evolution campaigns will be driven in the commercial space, resulting in more simple and less expensive methods and tools that can be applied to biotechnologically-relevant enzymes.

=== Chemical synthesis ===
Droplet-based microfluidics has become an important tool in chemical synthesis due to several attractive features. Microscale reactions allow for cost reduction through the usage of small reagent volumes, rapid reactions in the order of milliseconds, and efficient heat transfer that leads to environmental benefits when the amount of energy consumed per unit temperature rise can be extremely small. The degree of control over local conditions within the devices often makes it possible to select one product over another with high precision. With high product selectivity and small sizes of reagents and reaction environments come less stringent reaction clean-up and smaller footprint. Microdispersed droplets created by droplet-based chemistry are capable of acting as environments in which chemical reactions occur, as reagent carriers in the process of generating complex nanostructures. Droplets are also capable of being transformed into cell-like structures which can be used to mimic humans' biological components and processes.

As a method of chemical synthesis, Droplets in microfluidics devices act as individual reaction chambers protected from contamination through device fouling by the continuous phase. Benefits of synthesis using this regime (compared to batch processes) include high throughput, continuous experiments, low waste, portability, and a high degree of synthetic control. Some examples of possible syntheses are the creation of semiconductor microspheres and nanoparticles. Chemical detection is integrated into the device to ensure careful monitoring of reactions, NMR spectroscopy, microscopy, electrochemical detection, and chemiluminescent detection are used. Often, measurements are taken at different points along the microfluidic device to monitor the progress of the reaction.

Increased rate of reactions using microdroplets is seen in the aldol reaction of silyl enol ethers and aldehydes. Using a droplet-based microfluidic device, reaction times were shortened to twenty minutes versus the twenty-four hours required for a batch process. Other experimenters were able to show a high selectivity of cis-stilbene to the thermodynamically favored trans-stilbene compared to the batch reaction, showing the high degree of control afforded by microreactor droplets. This stereocontrol is beneficial to the pharmaceutical industry. For instance, L-Methotrexate, a drug used in chemotherapy, is more readily absorbed than the D isomer.

==== Liquid crystal microcapsules ====
Fabrication of liquid crystals has been a point of intrigue for over 5 decades for their anisotropic properties. Microfluidic devices can be used for the synthesis of confined cholesteric liquid crystals through layering of multiple shell-like layers consisting of varying oil-in-water and water-in-oil emulsions. The construction of encapsulated liquid crystals through microfluidic flow of liquid crystal droplets in an immiscible oil allows for monodispersed emulsion layer thickness and composition previously unseen before the advent of microfluidic techniques. The advent of liquid crystal technology has led to advancements in optical displays used both in research and consumer branded products, but more recent discoveries have opened the door to the combination of photon combination and upconversion as well as optical sensors for biological analytes.

==== Microparticle and nanoparticle synthesis ====
Advanced particles and particle-based materials, such as polymer particles, microcapsules, nanocrystals, and photonic crystal clusters or beads can be synthesized with the assistance of droplet-based microfluidics. Nanoparticles, such as colloidal CdS and CdS/CdSe core-shell nanoparticles, can also be synthesized through multiple steps on a millisecond time scale in a microfluidic droplet-based system.

Nanoparticles, microparticles and colloidal clusters in microfluidic devices are useful for functions such as drug delivery. The first particles incorporated in droplet-based systems were silica gels in the micrometer size range in order to test their applications in the manufacturing of displays and optical coatings. Mixing solid particles with aqueous microdroplets requires changes to microfluidic channels such as additional reagent mixes and choice of specific materials such as silica or polymers that do not interfere with the channels and any bioactive substances the droplets contain.

The synthesis of copolymers requires milling macroscopic molecules to microparticles with porous, irregular surfaces using organic solvents and emulsification techniques. These droplets preloaded with microparticles can also be quickly processed using UV irradiation. Characterization of these microparticles and nanoparticles involves microimaging for analyzing the structure and the identification of the macroscopic material being milled. Techniques such as the controlled encapsulation of individual gas bubbles to create hollow nanoparticles for synthesizing microbubbles with specific contents are vital for drug delivery systems. Both silica and titanium-based microparticles are used as durable shells after using gas to increase the flow velocity of the aqueous phase. A higher flow velocity allows greater control over the thickness of the aqueous shells. The emerging versatility of nanoparticles can be seen in the delivery of particle-loaded microdroplets being utilized in depot injections for drug delivery rather than the typical approach of injecting drugs intravenously. This is possible due to the low thickness of the shells which typically are in the range of 1 to 50 μm.

More recent advancements in microfluidic particles allowed the synthesis of nanometer sized particles from biologically derived polymers. Using specific flow-focusing multiphase designs that control flow rate and temperature, the size of nanoparticle formation can be controlled along with the concentration and configuration of the droplets. Another technique for creating particle-loaded microdroplets is the use of lipid-hydrogel nanoparticles that can be manipulated into more narrowly shaped droplets, which is useful when soft or brittle materials must be used. These soft materials are especially important in the production of powders. Recent advancements on the nanoscale such as devices that fabricate both spherical and non-spherical droplets that are ultrafast and homogeneous mixed are being produced for large scale production of powdered particles in industrial applications.

Monodispersed nanoparticles are also of great interest in catalyst fabrication. Many heterogeneous catalytic systems efficiencies rely on high surface areas of transition metal particles. Microfluidic techniques have been used to fabricate gold nanoparticles through the interfacial interaction of droplets containing gold chloride, hexane, and a reducing agent with a surrounding aqueous phase. This process can also control both the size and shape of nanoparticles/nanosheets with precision and high throughput compared to other methods such as physical vapor deposition.

The use of droplets containing various materials such as silica or transition metals such as gold flowed through an immiscible oil phase has been shown to be effective in controlling both size of nanoparticles as well as pore size, which allows for design of efficient absorptive gas capture devices and heterogeneous catalysts. Monodispersed nanoparticles of gold and silver have been synthesized using gold and silver chloride droplets dosed with a reducing agent to cleave metal-ligand bonds, leading to the agglomeration of monodispersed metal nanoparticles which can be easily filtered out of solution.

==== Gel particle synthesis ====
The synthesis of gel particles also known as hydrogels, microgels, and nanogels, has been an area of interest for researchers and industries alike for the last several decades. A microfluidic based approach to synthesizing these hydrogel particles is a useful tool, due to high throughput, mono-dispersity of particles, and cost reduction through the use of small reagent volumes. One of the key challenges early on in the field of gels was forming monodisperse particles. Initially polymerization-based techniques were used to form bulk microparticles that were polydisperse in size. These techniques generally were centered around using an aqueous solution that was mixed vigorously to create emulsions. Eventually a technique was developed to create monodisperse biodegradable microgels by making O/W emulsions in an in-line droplet generating channel geometry. This junction geometry accompanied with a surfactant laden continuous phase was responsible for creating microgels made from poly-dex-HEMA. Other device geometries including T-junction style formation are also viable and have been used to make silica-based gels.

Once these methods were established, efforts focused on applying functionality to these particles. Examples include bacteria encapsulated particles, drug or protein encapsulated particles, and magnetic gel particles. To insert these functional components into the gel structure, can be as simple as integrating the component into the dispersed phase. In some cases, certain device geometries are preferred, for example a flow focusing junction was used to encapsulate bacteria in agarose microparticles. Multiple emulsions are of interest for pharmaceutical and cosmetic applications and are formed using two consecutive flow focusing junctions. More complicated particles can also be synthesized such as Janus particles, which have surfaces with two or more distinct physical properties.

Some examples of the increasing application of gel particles include drug delivery, biomedical applications, and tissue engineering, and many of these applications require monodisperse particles where a microfluidics-based approach is preferred. Bulk emulsification methods are still relevant, though, since not all applications require uniform microparticles. The future of microfluidic synthesis of gels may lie in developing techniques to create bulk amounts of these uniform particles in order to make them more commercially/industrially available.

Recent developments in droplet microfluidics have also allowed for in situ synthesis of hydrogel fibers containing aqueous droplets with controlled morphology. Hydrogel fibers provide an intriguing option for biocompatible material for drug delivery and bioprinting of materials that can mimic the behavior of an extracellular matrix. This microfluidic method differs from the traditional wet-spinning synthesis route through the use of aqueous droplets in an immiscible oil stream rather than the extrusion of a bulk solution of the same composition mixed off site. The ability to control the size, flow rate, and composition of droplets provides an option to fine tune the morphology of fibers to fit a specific use in bioanalysis and emulation of anatomical functions.

=== Extraction and phase transfer using droplet microfluidics ===
Liquid-liquid extraction is a method used to separate an analyte from a complex mixture; with this method compounds separate based on their relative solubility in different immiscible liquid phases. To overcome some of the disadvantages associated with common bench top methods such as the shake-flask method, Microfluidic liquid-liquid extraction methods have been employed. Microfluidic droplet-based systems have demonstrated the capability to manipulate discrete volumes of fluids in immiscible phases with low Reynolds numbers. and laminar flow regimes. Microscale methods reduce time required, reduce sample and reagent volume, and allow for automation and integration. In some studies, the performance of droplet-based microfluidic extraction compares closely with the shake-flask method. A study which compared the shake-flask and microfluidic liquid-Liquid extrication methods for 26 compounds and found a close correlation between the values obtained (R2= 0.994).

It has also been demonstrated that microfluidic liquid-liquid extraction devices can be integrated with other instruments for detection of the extracted analytes. For example, microfluidic extraction could be used to extract an analyte initially in an aqueous phase such as cocaine in saliva then interfaced with on-chip IR spectroscopy for detection. Microfluidic liquid-liquid extraction has shown to be advantageous in numerous applications such as pharmacokinetic drug studies where only small cell numbers are needed, and in additional studies where smaller reagent volumes are required.

Droplet-based microfluidics can also be used for chemical phase transfer reactions. An early example was the synthesis of azo dyes in nanoliter fluid segments using a double injector chip device.

== Droplet detection ==
=== Separation methods ===
Droplet-based microfluidic systems can be coupled to separation methods for specific tasks. Common separation techniques coupled to droplet-based microfluidic systems include high-performance liquid chromatography (HPLC) and electrophoresis.

==== High-performance liquid chromatography ====
Many forms of chromatography, including high-performance liquid chromatography (HPLC), nanoflow ultra-performance liquid chromatography (nano-UPLC or nano-LC), and 2-dimensional capillary flow chromatography (capillary LC), have been integrated into the field of droplet-based microfluidics. On the microscale, chemical separation techniques like HPLC can be used in both biological and chemical analysis. Within the field of microfluidics, these techniques have been applied to microfluidic systems at three different stages in the microfluidic process. Off-chip HPLC columns are used to separate analytes before feeding them into a microfluidic device for fractionation and analysis. HPLC columns can also be built directly into microfluidic lab-chips creating monolithic hybrid devices capable of chemical separation as well as droplet formation and manipulation. Additionally, HPLC is used at the tail end of droplet-based microfluidic chemistry as a way to purify, analyze, and quantify the products of an experiment.

Droplet-based microfluidic devices coupled to HPLC have high detection sensitivity, use low volumes of reagents, have short analysis times, and minimal cross-contamination of analytes, which make them efficient in many aspects. However, there are still problems associated with microscale chromatography, such as dispersion of separated bands, diffusion, and "dead volume" in channels after separation. One way to bypass these issues is the use of droplets to compartmentalize separation bands, which combats diffusion and the loss of separated analytes. In early attempts to integrate chromatography with droplet microfluidics, the lower flow rates and pressures required for 2-D capillary LC provided less of an obstacle to overcome in combining these technologies and made it possible to couple multiple 2-D separation techniques into one device (i.e. HPLC x LC, LC x LC, and HPLC x HPLC). HPLC autosamplers feeding into microfluidic devices have taken advantage of the dispersion occurring between separation and droplet formation to feed gradient pulses of analytes into microfluidic devices where the production of thousands of pico-liter droplets captures unique analyte concentrations. Similar approaches have used the withdrawal capabilities of a syringe pump to align the relatively high flow rates necessary for HPLC with the lower flow rates of the continuous medium common in microfluidic devices. The development of nano-LC, or nano-UPLC, has provided another opportunity for coupling with microfluidic devices such that large droplet libraries can be formed with multiple dimensions of information being stored in each droplet. Instead of identifying peaks and storing them as a single sample, as seen in standard LC, these droplet libraries allow for the specific concentration of the analyte to be retained along with its identity. Moreover, the ability to perform high frequency fractionation immediately from the eluent of a nano-LC column has greatly increases peak resolution and improved the overall separation quality when compared to continuous flow nano-LC devices.

An HPLC column was first built directly into a microfluidic device by using TPE instead of PDMS for the device fabrication. The additional strength of TPE made it capable of supporting the higher pressures needed for HPLC such that a single, microfluidic lab-chip could perform chemical separation, fractionation, and further droplet manipulation. In order to increase the quality of chromatographic output, sturdier devices made of glass have shown the ability to withstand far greater pressure than TPE. Achieving these higher pressures to increase the degree of separation and eliminating all dead volumes through immediate droplet formation has shown the potential for droplet microfluidics to expand and improve the capabilities of HPLC separations.

==== Electrophoresis ====
Capillary electrophoresis (CE) and microcapillary gel electrophoresis (μCGE) are well-recognized microchip electrophoresis (MCE) methods that can provide numerous analytical advantages including high resolution, high sensitivity, and effective coupling to mass spectrometry (MS). Microchip electrophoresis can be applied generally as a method for high-throughput screening processes that help discover and evaluate drugs. Using MCE, specifically CE, microcapillary gel electrophoresis (μCGE) devices are created to perform high-number DNA sample processing, which makes it a good candidate for DNA analysis. μCGE devices are also practical for separation purposes because they use online separation, characterization, encapsulation, and selection of differing analytes originating from a composite sample. All of these advantages of MCE methods translate to microfluidic devices. The reason MCE methods are coupled to droplet-based microfluidic devices is because of the ability to analyze samples on the nanoliter scale. Using MCE methods on a small scale reduces cost and reagent use. Similarly to HPLC, fluorescence based detection techniques are used for capillary electrophoresis, which make these methods practical and can be applied to fields such as biotechnology, analytical chemistry, and drug development. These MCE and other electrophoresis based methods began to develop once capillary electrophoresis gained popularity in the 1980s and gained even more attention in the early 1990s, as it was reviewed nearly 80 times by the year 1992.

Mass spectrometry (MS) is a near universal detection technique that is recognized throughout the world as the gold standard for identification of manycompounds. MS is an analytical technique in which chemical species are ionized and sorted before detection, and the resulting mass spectrum is used to identify the ions' parent molecules. This makes MS, unlike other detection techniques (such as fluorescence), label-free; i.e. there is no need to bind additional ligands or groups to the molecule of interest in order to receive a signal and identify the compound.

=== Mass spectrometry ===
Mass spectrometry (MS) is a near universal detection technique that is recognized throughout the world as the gold standard for identification of manycompounds. MS is an analytical technique in which chemical species are ionized and sorted before detection, and the resulting mass spectrum is used to identify the ions' parent molecules. This makes MS, unlike other detection techniques (such as fluorescence), label-free; i.e. there is no need to bind additional ligands or groups to the molecule of interest in order to receive a signal and identify the compound.

There are many cases in which other spectroscopic methods, such as nuclear magnetic resonance (NMR), fluorescence, infrared, or Raman, are not viable as standalone methods due to the particular chemical composition of the droplets. Often, these droplets are sensitive to fluorescent labels, or contain species that are otherwise indeterminately similar, where MS may be employed along with other methods to characterize a specific analyte of interest. However, MS has only recently (in the past decade) gained popularity as a detection method for droplet-based microfluidics (and microfluidics as a whole) due to challenges associated with coupling mass spectrometers with these miniaturized devices. Difficulty of separation/purification make entirely microfluidic scale systems coupled to mass spectrometry ideal in the fields of proteomics, enzyme kinetics, drug discovery, and newborn disease screening. The two primary methods of ionization for mass analysis used in droplet-based microfluidics today are matrix-assisted laser desorption/ionization (MALDI) and electrospray ionization (ESI). Additional methods for coupling, such as (but not limited to) surface acoustic wave nebulization (SAWN), and paper-spray ionization onto miniaturized MS, are being developed as well.

==== Electrospray ionization ====
One complication offered by the coupling of MS to droplet-based microfluidics is that the dispersed samples are produced at comparatively low flow rates compared to traditional MS-injection techniques. ESI is able to easily accept these low flow rates and is now commonly exploited for on-line microfluidic analysis. ESI and MALDI offer a high throughput answer to the problem of label-free droplet detection, but ESI requires less intensive sample preparation and fabrication elements that are scalable to microfluidic device scale. ESI involves the application of a high voltage to a carrier stream of analyte-containing droplets, which aerosolizes the stream, followed by detection at a potential-differentiated analyser region. The carrier fluid within a droplet-based microfluidic device, typically an oil, is often an obstacle within ESI. The oil, when part of the flow of droplets going into an ESI-MS instrument, can cause a constant background voltage interfering with the detection of sample droplets. This background interference can be rectified by changing the oil used as a carrier fluid and by adjusting the voltage used for the electrospray.

Droplet size, Taylor cone shape, and flow rate can be controlled by varying the potential differential and the temperature of a drying (to evaporate analyte-surrounding solvent) stream of gas (usually nitrogen). Because ESI allows for online droplet detection, other problems posed by segmented or off-chip detection based systems can be solved, such as the minimizing of sample (droplet) dilution, which is especially critical to microfluidic droplet detection where analyte samples are already diluted to the lowest experimentally relevant concentration.

==== Matrix-assisted laser desorption/ionization ====
MALDI is typified by the use of an ultraviolet (UV) laser to trigger ablation of analyte species that are mixed with a matrix of crystallized molecules with high optical absorption. The ions within the resulting ablated gasses are then protonated or deprotonated before acceleration into a mass spectrometer. The primary advantages of MALDI detection over ESI in microfluidic devices are that MALDI allows for much easier multiplexing, which even further increases the device's overall throughput, as well as less reliance on moving parts, and the absence of Taylor cone stability problems posed by microfluidic-scale flow rates. The speed of MALDI detection, along with the scale of microfluidic droplets, allows for improvements upon macro-scale techniques in both throughput and time-of-flight (TOF) resolution. Where typical MS detection setups often utilize separation techniques such as chromatography, MALDI setups require a sufficiently purified sample to be mixed with pre-determined organic matrices, suited for the specific sample, prior to detection. MALDI matrix composition must be tuned to produce appropriate fragmentation and ablation of analytes.

One method to obtain a purified sample from droplet-based microfluidics is to end the microfluidic channel onto a MALDI plate, with aqueous droplets forming on hydrophilic regions on the plate. Solvent and carrier fluid are then allowed to evaporate, leaving behind only the dried droplets of the sample of interest, after which the MALDI matrix is applied to the dried droplets. This sample preparation has notable limitations and complications, which are not currently overcome for all types of samples. Additionally, MALDI matrices are preferentially in much higher concentrations than the analyte sample, which allows for microfluidic droplet transportation to be incorporated into online MALDI matrix production. Due to the low number of known matrices and trial and error nature of finding appropriate new matrix compositions, this can be the determining factor in the use of other forms of spectroscopy over MALDI.

=== Raman spectroscopy ===
Raman spectroscopy is a spectroscopic technique that provides non-destructive analysis capable of identifying components within mixtures with chemical specificity without complex sample preparation. Raman spectroscopy relies on photon scattering following visible light radiation, where the shift in photon energies corresponds to information about the system's vibrational modes and their frequencies. Upon obtaining vibrational modenfrequencies, qualitative classifications about the system can be both made and reinforced.

Raman spectroscopy works well in parallel with microfluidic devices for many qualitative biological applications. For some applications, Raman spectroscopy is preferred over other detection methods such as infrared (IR) spectroscopy as water has a strong interference signal with IR but not with Raman. Likewise, methods such as high-performance liquid chromatography (HPLC), nuclear magnetic resonance (NMR), mass spectrometry (MS), or gas chromatography (GC) are also not ideal as these methods require larger sample sizes. Since microfluidics enables experiments with small volumes (including analysis of single cells or few cells), Raman is a leading microfluidic detection method. Specifically, Raman integration with microfluidic devices has strong applications in systems where lipid identification is necessary, common in biofuel research. For example, a lipid fluorescent assay is not selective enough and thus cannot identify molecular differences the way Raman can through molecular vibrations. Raman, when coupled with microfluidic devices, can also monitor fluid mixing and trapping of liquids and can also detect solid and gas phases within microfluidic platforms, an ability that is applicable to the study of gas-liquid solubility.

Raman spectroscopy in microfluidic devices is applied and detected using either integrated fiberoptics within a microfluidic chip or by placing the device on a Raman microscope. Furthermore, some microfluidic systems utilize metallic colloid or nanoparticles within solution to capitalize on surface-enhanced Raman spectroscopy (SERS). SERS can improve Raman scattering by up to a factor of 10^{11} by forming charge-transfer complexes on the surfaces. It follows that these devices are commonly fabricated out of nanoporous polycarbonate membranes allowing for easy coating of nanoparticle. However, if fabricated out of polydimethylsiloxane (PDMS), signal interference with the Raman spectrum can occur. PDMS generates a strong Raman signal which can easily overpower and interfere with the desired signal. A common solution for this is fabricating the microfluidic device such that a confocal pinhole can be used for the Raman laser. Typical confocal Raman microscopy allows for spectroscopic information from small focal volumes less than 1 micron cubed, and thus smaller than the microfluidic channel dimensions. Raman signal is inherently weak; therefore, for short detection times at small sample volumes in microfluidic devices, signal amplification is utilized. Multi-photon Raman spectroscopy, such as stimulated Raman spectroscopy (SRS) or coherent anti-Stokes Raman spectroscopy (CARS) help enhance signals from substances in microfluidic devices. A convenient approach for application of SERS-active metal nanoparticles is their embedding in gel-like particles or surface deposition on polymer micro particles.

For droplet-based microfluidics, Raman detection provides online analysis of multiple analytes within droplets or continuous phase. Raman signal is sensitive to concentration changes, therefore solubility and mixing kinetics of a droplet-based microfluidic system can be detected using Raman. Considerations include the refractive index difference at the interface of the droplet and continuous phase, as well as between fluid and channel connections.

=== Fluorescent detection ===
Fluorescence spectroscopy is one of the most common droplet detection techniques. It provides a rapid response, and, for applicable analytes, it has a strong signal. The use of fluorescence spectroscopy in microfluidics follows a similar format to most other fluorescent analytical techniques. A light source is used to excite analyte molecules in the sample, after which the analyte fluoresces, and the fluorescence response is the measured output. Cameras can be used to capture the fluorescence signal of the droplets, and filters are often used to filter out scattered excitation light. In microfluidic droplet detection, the experimental setup of a fluorescence instrument can vary greatly. A common setup in fluorescent droplet detection is with the use of an epifluorescence microscope. This sometimes utilizes a confocal geometry, which can vary depending on experimental needs. For example, Jeffries et al. reported success with exploring an orthogonal confocal geometry, as opposed to a standard epi geometry. However, other setups for fluorescence detection have been explored, as epifluorescence microscopes can be expensive and difficult to upkeep. Cole et al. have proposed and tested an experimental setup with fiber optics to conduct fluorescence analysis of microfluidic droplets.

Fluorescence detection of droplets has a number of advantages. First, it can accommodate a large and fast throughput. Analysis of thousands of samples can be conducted in a short period of time, which is advantageous for the analysis of a large number of samples. Another advantage is the accuracy of the method. In an analysis performed by Li et al., it was found that use of fluorescence detection techniques yielded 100% detection accuracy in 13 of 15 collected images. The remaining two had relative errors around 6%. Another advantage of fluorescence detection is that it allows for quantitative analysis of droplet spacing in a sample. This is done by use of temporal measurements and the flow velocity of the analyte. The time spacing between signals allows for calculation of droplet spacing. Further fluorescence analysis of microfluidic droplet samples can be used to measure the fluorescent lifetime of samples, providing additional information that is not obtainable for fluorescence intensity measurements alone.

The applications of fluorescence detection are varied, with many of its uses centered in biological applications. Frenz et al. utilized fluorescence detection of droplets to examine enzyme kinetics. For this experiment, b-lactamase interacted with fluorocillin, a fluorogenic substrate. Fluorescence of the droplets was measured at multiple time intervals to examine the change with time. This detection method goes beyond biological applications, though, and allows for the physical study of droplet formation and evolution. For example, Sakai et al. used fluorescence detection to monitor droplet size. This was done by collecting fluorescence data to calculate the concentration of a fluorescent dye within a single droplet, thus allowing size growth to be monitored. The use of fluorescence detection techniques can be expanded into applications beyond data collection; a widely used method of cell and droplet sorting in microfluidics is fluorescence-activated sorting, where droplets are sorted into different channels or collection outlets based on their fluorescence intensity.

Fluorescent quantum dots have been used to develop biosensing platforms and drug delivery in microfluidic devices. Quantum dots are useful due to their small size, precise excitation wavelength, and high quantum yield. These are advantages over traditional dyes which may interfere with the activity of the studied compound. However, the bulk creation and conjugation of quantum dots to molecules of interest remains a challenge. Microfluidic devices that conjugate nucleotides with quantum dots have been designed to solve this issue by significantly reducing the conjugation time from two days to minutes. DNA-quantum dot conjugates are of importance to detect complementary DNA and miRNA in biological systems.

=== Electrochemical detection ===
Electrochemical detection serves as an inexpensive alternative to not only measure chemical composition in certain cases, but also droplet length, frequency, conductivity, and velocity at high speeds and usually with very little space compensation on the chip. The method was first discussed in Luo et al. wherein the team was able to successfully measure the size and ion concentration in pico-liter droplets containing dissolved NaCl ions. It is usually performed with a set or series of microelectrodes which measure the perturbations of current, smaller drops giving smaller perturbations while larger drops giving longer curves. The number of perturbations in the current can also indicate the frequency of the droplets passing the electrode as a way to determine the rate of droplets as well. Several different compounds have been suggested for use within the electrodes, as accurate, precise, and significant readings can be difficult within the microscale. These compounds range from carbon paste electrodes that are applied directly to the chip, to platinum black electrodeposited on platinum wire in tandem with a silver chloride on silver microelectrode to increase activity and surface area.

As for chemical composition, readings are achieved through chronoamperometric analysis of electro-active compounds within the droplets as stated above. The potential varies dependent on the electrically viable ions, dissolved sodium and chlorine ions in this experiment, and their concentrations within each droplet. Another group displayed, with a series of controls, that mixed droplet composition involving potassium iodide was detected accurately on the time scale of seconds with optimal voltage, velocity, and pH ranges. In addition to this, a more unique approach is developing within chronoamperometric readings, where magneto-fluidic systems have been created and the potential readings are measured in otherwise electro-inactive fluids by the dissolution of magnetic microparticles into the reagent. This method is enhanced into a digital microfluidic (DMF) setting, where gold and silver electrodes in junction with dissolved magnetic microparticles in the fluids replaced the typical fluorescence-based detection of droplets in the immunoassay of biomarker analytes.

The above experiment by Shamsi et al, alludes to the main use for electrochemical detection in microfluidics; biosensing for various measurements such as enzyme kinetics and biological assays of many other types of cells. Increased control on the system is needed for these processes as with increasing flow rate, enzyme detection decreases. Though as an enzymatic reaction progresses, the amperometric reading will evolve as well, allowing for rapid monitoring of the kinetics. Also, specific surfactants can lack biocompatibility with the system, affecting the enzyme and skewing detection. The reaches of this application have even had effects in aquaculture and economics, as electrochemical sensing has been used to test the freshness of fish rapidly. Use of this detection method is primarily found in the electrowetting of dielectric DMFs, where the sensing electrode apparatus can be reconfigurable and has a longer lifetime while still producing accurate results.
