= Electrowetting =

Physical process

Electrowetting is the modification of the wetting properties of a surface (which is typically hydrophobic) with an applied electric field.

== History ==
The electrowetting of mercury and other liquids on variably charged surfaces was probably first explained by Gabriel Lippmann in 1875 and was certainly observed much earlier. A. N. Frumkin used surface charge to change the shape of water drops in 1936. The term electrowetting was first introduced in 1981 by G. Beni and S. Hackwood to describe an effect proposed for designing a new type of display device for which they received a patent. The use of a "fluid transistor" in microfluidic circuits for manipulating chemical and biological fluids was first investigated by J. Brown in 1980 and later funded in 1984–1988 under NSF Grants 8760730 & 8822197, employing insulating dielectric and hydrophobic layer(s) (EWOD), immiscible fluids, DC or RF power; and mass arrays of miniature interleaved (saw tooth) electrodes with large or matching indium tin oxide (ITO) electrodes to digitally relocate nano droplets in linear, circular, and directed paths, pump or mix fluids, fill reservoirs, and control fluid flow electronically or optically. Later, in collaboration with J. Silver at the NIH, EWOD-based electrowetting was disclosed for single and immiscible fluids to move, separate, hold, and seal arrays of digital PCR sub-samples.

Electrowetting using an insulating layer on top of a bare electrode was later studied by Bruno Berge in 1993. Electrowetting on this dielectric-coated surface is called electrowetting-on-dielectric (EWOD) to distinguish it from the conventional electrowetting on the bare electrode. Electrowetting can be demonstrated by replacing the metal electrode in the EWOD system by a semiconductor. Electrowetting is also observed when a reverse bias is applied to a conducting droplet (e.g. mercury) which has been placed directly onto a semiconductor surface (e.g. silicon) to form a Schottky contact in a Schottky diode electrical circuit configuration – this effect has been termed 'Schottky electrowetting'.

Microfluidic manipulation of liquids by electrowetting was demonstrated first with mercury droplets in water and later with water in air and water in oil. Manipulation of droplets on a two-dimensional path was demonstrated later. If the liquid is discretized and programmably manipulated, the approach is called "Digital Microfluidic Circuits" or "Digital Microfluidics". Discretization by electrowetting-on-dielectric (EWOD) was first demonstrated by Cho, Moon, and Kim. Recently, backward electrowetting of droplets was demonstrated. Unlike conventional electrowetting where droplets move towards activated electrode, in backward electrowetting droplets are displaced towards the grounded electrode.

== Electrowetting theory ==
Liquid, Isolator, Substrate

The electrowetting effect has been defined as "the change in solid-electrolyte contact angle due to an applied potential difference between the solid and the electrolyte". The phenomenon of electrowetting can be understood in terms of the forces that result from the applied electric field. The fringing field at the corners of the electrolyte droplet tends to pull the droplet down onto the electrode, lowering the macroscopic contact angle and increasing the droplet contact area. Alternatively, electrowetting can be viewed from a thermodynamic perspective. Since the surface tension of an interface is defined as the Helmholtz free energy required to create a certain area of that surface, it contains both chemical and electrical components, and charge becomes a significant term in that equation. The chemical component is just the natural surface tension of the solid/electrolyte interface with no electric field. The electrical component is the energy stored in the capacitor formed between the conductor and the electrolyte.

The simplest derivation of electrowetting behavior is given by considering its thermodynamic model. While it is possible to obtain a detailed numerical model of electrowetting by considering the precise shape of the electrical fringing field and how it affects the local droplet curvature, such solutions are mathematically and computationally complex. The thermodynamic derivation proceeds as follows. Defining the relevant surface tensions as:

$\gamma_{ws} \,$ – The total, electrical and chemical, surface tension between the electrolyte and the conductor
$\gamma_{ws}^0 \,$ – The surface tension between the electrolyte and the conductor at zero electric field
$\gamma_s \,$ – The surface tension between the conductor and the external ambient
$\gamma_w \,$ – The surface tension between the electrolyte and the external ambient
$\theta$ – The macroscopic contact angle between the electrolyte and the dielectric
$C$ – The capacitance per area of the interface, є_{r}є_{0}/t, for a uniform dielectric of thickness t and permittivity є_{r}
$V$ – The effective applied voltage, integral of the electric field from the electrolyte to the conductor

Relating the total surface tension to its chemical and electrical components gives:

$$\gamma _{ws} = \gamma _{ws}^0 - \frac{CV^2}{2} \,$$

The contact angle is given by the Young-Dupre equation, with the only complication being that the total surface energy $\gamma_{ws}$ is used:

$$\gamma_{ws} = \gamma_s - \gamma_w \cos(\theta) \,$$

Combining the two equations gives the dependence of θ on the effective applied voltage as:

$$\cos \theta = \left(\frac{\gamma_s - \gamma _{ws}^0 +\frac{CV^2}{2}}{\gamma_w}\right) \,$$

An additional complication is that liquids also exhibit a saturation phenomenon: after certain voltage, the saturation voltage, the further increase of voltage will not change the contact angle, and with extreme voltages the interface will only show instabilities.

However, surface charge is but one component of surface energy, and other components are certainly perturbed by induced charge. So, a complete explanation of electrowetting is unquantified, but it should not be surprising that these limits exist.

It was recently shown by Klarman et al. that contact angle saturation can be explained as a universal effect- regardless of materials used – if electrowetting is observed as a global phenomenon affected by the detailed geometry of the system. Within this framework it is predicted that reversed electrowetting is also possible (contact angle grows with the voltage).

It has also been experimentally shown by Chevaloitt that contact angle saturation is invariant to all materials parameters, thus revealing that when good materials are utilized, most saturation theories are invalid. This same paper further suggests that electrohydrodynamic instability may be the source of saturation, a theory that is unproven but being suggested by several other groups as well.

== Reverse electrowetting ==
Reverse electrowetting can be used to harvest energy via a mechanical-to-electrical engineering scheme.

== Electrowetting on liquid-infused film (EWOLF) ==
Another electrowetting configuration is electrowetting on liquid-infused film. The liquid-infused film is achieved by locking a liquid lubricant in a porous membrane through the delicate control of wetting properties of the liquid and solid phases. Taking advantage of the negligible contact line pinning at the liquid-liquid interface, the droplet response in EWOLF can be electrically addressed with enhanced degree of switchability and reversibility compared to the conventional EWOD. Moreover, the infiltration of liquid lubricant phase in the porous membrane also efficiently enhances the viscous energy dissipation, suppressing the droplet oscillation and leading to fast response without sacrificing the desired electrowetting reversibility. Meanwhile, the damping effect associated with the EWOLF can be tailored by manipulating the viscosity and thickness of liquid lubricant.

== Opto- and photoelectrowetting ==
Optoelectrowetting, and photoelectrowetting are both optically induced electrowetting effects. Optoelectrowetting involves the use of a photoconductor whereas photoelectrowetting use a photocapacitance and can be observed if the conductor in the liquid/insulator/conductor stack used for electrowetting is replaced by a semiconductor. By optically modulating the number of carriers in the space-charge region of the semiconductor, the contact angle of a liquid droplet can be altered in a continuous way. This effect can be explained by a modification of the Young-Lippmann equation.

== Materials ==
For reasons that are still under investigation, only a limited set of surfaces exhibit the theoretically predicted electrowetting behavior. Because of this, alternative materials that can be used to coat and functionalize the surface are used to create the expected wetting behavior. For example, amorphous fluoropolymers are widely used electrowetting coating materials, and it has been found that the behavior of these fluoropolymers can be enhanced by the appropriate surface patterning. These fluoropolymers coat the necessary conductive electrode, typically made of aluminum foil or indium tin oxide (ITO), to create the desired electrowetting properties. Three types of such polymers are commercially available: FluoroPel hydrophobic and superhydrophobic V-series polymers are sold by Cytonix, CYTOP is sold by Asahi Glass Co., and Teflon AF is sold by DuPont. Other surface materials such as SiO2 and gold on glass have been used. These materials allow the surfaces themselves to act as the ground electrodes for the electric current.

== Applications ==
Electrowetting is now used in a wide range of applications, from modular to adjustable lenses, electronic displays (e-paper), electronic outdoor displays, and switches for optical fibers. Electrowetting has recently been evoked for manipulating soft matter particularly, suppressing coffee ring effect. Furthermore, filters with electrowetting functionality has been suggested for cleaning oil spills and separating oil-water mixtures.

== International meeting ==
An international meeting for electrowetting is held every two years. The most recent meeting was held on June 18 to 20, 2018, at the University of Twente, the Netherlands.

The previous hosts of the electrowetting meeting are: Mons (1999), Eindhoven (2000), Grenoble (2002), Blaubeuren (2004), Rochester (2006), Los Angeles (2008), Pohang (2010), Athens (2012), Cincinnati (2014), Taipei (2016).

== See also ==
- Metal–semiconductor junction
- Microfluidics
- Soft matter
- Wetting
