= UBC Okanagan Digital Microfluidics =

The UBC Okanagan Digital Microfluidics Research Group is an interdisciplinary research group at the University of British Columbia Okanagan that develops integrated devices for biochip applications. Lab-on-a-chip digital microfluidic devices are fabricated in digital architectures that merge micrometre-scale electrical circuitry with applications requiring dynamic fluid control, as voltage actuation signals from patterned electrodes are used to direct and actuate fluid flow within the chips. The structures are not application-specific. Fluid actuation signals for droplet mixing, splitting, and routing are set by the control software and can be reconfigured as needed and in real-time (unlike continuous-flow microfluidic structures incorporating micropumps, microvalves, and microchannels which are fabricated as permanent application-specific structures).
