= Boris Rotman =

Chilean American biologist (1924–2021)

Marcos Boris Rotman
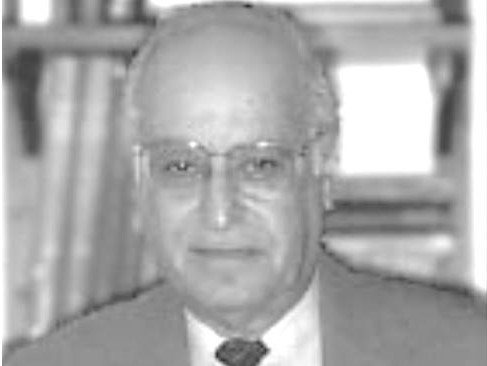
- Boris Rotman, 2011
- Born: December 4, 1924; Buenos Aires, Argentina
- Died: July 11, 2021 (aged 96)
- Citizenship: American
- Education: University of Illinois (PhD, 1952); Universidad Tecnica Federico Santa Maria (M.S., 1948)
- Known for: First single molecule experiment in biology
- Spouse(s): Raquel Yudelevich S. (1933-1971; widowed); Rosario Guzman-Rotman (married 1993)
- Children: Jessica R. Yates
- Awards: State of Rhode Island Governor's Award for Scientific Achievement (1990)
- Scientific career
- Fields: Biochemistry; Molecular biology
- Workplaces: Brown University; Stanford Medical School; Syntex Institute for Molecular Biology, Stanford; Escuela de Medicina, Universidad de Chile; Karolinska Institute; Weizmann Institute of Science – Dept. of Chemical Immunology
- Thesis: A heritable conversion of phenotype in yeast. (1952)
- Doctoral advisor: Salvador Luria and Sol Spiegelman
- Other academic advisors: Joshua Lederberg

Marcos Boris Rotman (December 4, 1924 – July 11, 2021) was a Chilean American immunologist–molecular biologist and professor emeritus of Medical Science at Alpert Medical School of Brown University. He is widely recognized for performing the first single molecule experiments in biology. He died in July 2021 at the age of 96.

== Education ==
Rotman attended elementary and high school at the Instituto Nacional of Chile. In 1942, he won a scholarship to attend the Universidad Técnica Federico Santa Maria, from where he graduated with a chemical engineering degree in 1948. In 1950, he entered the University of Illinois and in 1952 earned a PhD in biochemistry/microbiology. His mentors at University of Illinois were Salvador E. Luria (Nobel laureate 1969) and Sol Spiegelman (Albert Lasker Award for Basic Medical Research, 1974). After graduation, Rotman was a postdoctoral researcher in the group of Joshua Lederberg (Nobel laureate 1958) at University of Wisconsin-Madison, and later, in the laboratory of Bernard D. Davis at Harvard Medical School.

== Research career ==
In 1961, Rotman developed a system capable of measuring the enzymatic activity of individual molecules of beta-galactosidase and used it to conduct the first single-molecule experiment in biology.

These early experiments remained obscure for more than 30 years, but they are now recognized as pioneering and highly influential. A review states, "Indeed, this paper is the origin not only of the field of single-molecule enzymology, but also of much subsequent single-molecule research." The significance of single-molecule experiments derives from their capacity to provide fundamental insights that are not attainable by conventional experimentation. For example (a) Enzyme turnover can be measured directly from the number of fluorescent molecules of product produced by an individual enzyme molecule. (b) Studying heat inactivation of an enzyme at the single molecule level uncovered unprecedented mechanisms. Namely, heating causes an all-or-none distribution of enzymatic activity, i. e., the molecular population consists of either fully active or completely inactive enzyme molecules. This experiment rules out an alternative plausible mechanism postulating that partial heat inactivation produces enzyme molecules with partial activity; (c) In contrast, partial inactivation of beta-galactosidase resulting from storing crystalline enzyme under ammonium sulfate at low temperature (3-6 °C) for several years, causes a uniform distribution of partially inactivated enzyme molecules, (d) A point mutation in the lacZ gene alters beta-galactosidase activity producing uniform populations of beta-galactosidase molecules with individual partial activity.

It is noteworthy that the first single-molecule experiment utilized two innovative technologies, droplet-based microfluidics and fluorogenic substrates. The former was developed by J. F. Collins to measure penicillinase content of individual Bacillus licheniformis. The latter, fluorogenic substrates are non-fluorescent compounds yielding fluorescent products upon enzymatic action. Fluorogenic substrates serve to increase the sensitivity of enzyme assays and many are commercially available.

In 1966, Rotman and Papermaster discovered fluorochromasia, a universal cellular phenomenon characterized by the immediate appearance of bright green fluorescence inside viable cells upon exposure to certain membrane permeable fluorogenic substrates such as fluorescein diacetate, fluorescein dibutyrate, and fluorescein dipropionate. The phenomenon is commonly used to measure cellular viability of many different species including animals, embryos, plants, and microorganisms.

In 1968, Rotman and Celada reported existence of a subset of antibodies with the unprecedented ability to restore the activity of mutated molecules of defective beta-galactosidase by conformational change. Subsequently, this exceptional ability of some antibodies has been subject of many studies.

== Awards ==
In 1990, Rotman received the State of Rhode Island Governor's Award for Scientific Excellence.

== Selected publications ==
- Rotman, B.; Spiegelman, S. (October 1, 1954). "On the origin of the carbon in the induced synthesis β-galactosidase in Escherichia coli". Journal of Bacteriology. 68 (4): 419–429. doi:10.1128/JB.68.4.419-429.1954. ISSN 0021-9193. PMC 357415. PMID 13201546.
- Rotman, B. (December 1, 1961). "Measurement of activity of single molecules of β-D-galactosidase". Proceedings of the National Academy of Sciences. 47 (12): 1981–1991. Bibcode:1961PNAS...47.1981R. doi:10.1073/pnas.47.12.1981. ISSN 0027-8424. PMC 223251. PMID 14038788.
- Rotman, Boris; Zderic, John A.; Edelstein, Marvene (June 22, 1963). "Fluorogenic Substrates for β -D-galactosidases and Phosphatases Derived from Fluorescein (3, 6-dihydroxyfluoran) and Its Monomethyl Ether". Proceedings of the National Academy of Sciences of the United States of America. 50 (1): 1–6. Bibcode:1963PNAS...50....1R. doi:10.1073/pnas.50.1.1. JSTOR 71664. PMC 300644. PMID 13975398.
- Rotman, B.; Papermaster, B. W. (January 1, 1966). "Membrane properties of living mammalian cells as studied by enzymatic hydrolysis of fluorogenic esters". Proceedings of the National Academy of Sciences. 55 (1): 134–141. Bibcode:1966PNAS...55..134R. doi:10.1073/pnas.55.1.134. ISSN 0027-8424. PMC 285766. PMID 5220862.
- Ganesan, A. K.; Rotman, B. (March 1, 1966). "Transport systems for galactose and galactosides in Escherichia coli: I. Genetic determination and regulation of the methyl-galactoside permease". Journal of Molecular Biology. 16 (1): 42–50. doi:10.1016/S0022-2836(66)80261-9. ISSN 0022-2836. PMID 5331243.
- Celada, F.; Rotman, B. (March 1, 1967). "A fluorochromatic test for immunocytotoxicity against tumor cells and leucocytes in agarose plates". Proceedings of the National Academy of Sciences. 57 (3): 630–636. Bibcode:1967PNAS...57..630C. doi:10.1073/pnas.57.3.630. ISSN 0027-8424. PMC 335555. PMID 16591510.
- Rotman, M B; Celada, F (June 1, 1968). "Antibody-mediated activation of a defective beta-D-galactosidase extracted from an Escherichia coli mutant". Proceedings of the National Academy of Sciences. 60 (2): 660–667. Bibcode:1968PNAS...60..660R. doi:10.1073/pnas.60.2.660. ISSN 0027-8424. PMC 225097. PMID 4882747.
- Rotman, B.; Ganesan, A. K.; Guzman, R. (September 14, 1968). "Transport systems for galactose and galactosides in Escherichia coli: II. Substrate and inducer specificities". Journal of Molecular Biology. 36 (2): 247–260. doi:10.1016/0022-2836(68)90379-3. ISSN 0022-2836. PMID 4939625.
- Maloney, P. C.; Rotman, B. (January 1, 1973). "Distribution of suboptimally induced β-d-galactosidase in Escherichia coli: The enzyme content of individual cells". Journal of Molecular Biology. 73 (1): 77–91. doi:10.1016/0022-2836(73)90160-5. ISSN 0022-2836. PMID 4570383.
