= Microfluidics in chemical biology =

Interdisciplinary science in scientific discipline

Microfluidics in chemical biology is the application of microfluidics in the study of chemical biology.

Due to its physical dimensions, microfluidics both provides a unique platform to utilize chemical biology tools and serves as a chemical biology tool in itself. Defined as the manipulation of fluids through micron sized channels, the field of microfluidics has been studied extensively over the past twenty years, and much is known about how fluids behave at this scale. As such, this knowledge can, and has been used to manipulate biological samples in ways that cannot be achieved using standard bulk methods.

== Advantages ==
The main advantages achieved through miniaturization of sample volume with regards to chemical biology applications include the ability to perform high-throughput experiments using a minimum of sample, the means to isolate, amplify and detect rare events from a complex mixture, and the resources to perturb the environment of a cellular sample at the scale of the cell itself. Through these capabilities researchers have been able to use microfluidics to crystallize proteins, perform the polymerase chain reaction, sequence DNA, study protein expression of single cells, perturb embryonic development in flies, culture cells as well as perform many other important biological studies.

One unique feature that results from miniaturization of the sample vessel is the inevitable increased surface area to volume ratio. This inherent feature of microfluidic experiments can either lend to the advantages of using microfluidics or it can necessitate further refinement of experimental technique. In some instances, it is desirable to be able to direct molecules of interest to the interface between two phases. In this case, the enhanced surface area relative to the total reaction volume lends to the success of the experimental design. In other instances, it is necessary to prevent the migration of molecules to the surface. The most common instance of this is the propensity of protein molecules to adsorb at the interface between either air and water or oil and water. For these applications, it is necessary to modify the surfaces with either a surfactant or some other chemical additive to prevent this undesired effect.

== Materials ==
The ability to design and manufacture devices to perform microfluidic experiments using well established approaches lends to the utility of studying chemical biology with microfluidics. The most common material used for device manufacturing is polydimethylsiloxane (PDMS). This material is far and away the most popular among researchers due to its compatible properties with biological systems. These characteristics include its relative inertness to most substances, its transparency to ultraviolet and visible light, its malleability and its permeability to gases. Additionally, PDMS surfaces can be treated to render them either hydrophilic or hydrophobic, depending on the desired application. This versatility allows PDMS to be used in nearly all microfluidic applications. Despite its wide range of uses, there are instances where other materials are preferred. Glass is a common alternative when PDMS is not desirable. Soft lithography is the most common method for making PDMS devices. This technique is relatively cheap and can be used to make nearly any architecture used in microfluidic experiments.

== Applications ==
Depending upon the nature of the desired experiment, the manner in which the fluids are manipulated and the number of phases present within the fluid flow can be different. The Reynolds number (Re) determines whether fluid flow is laminar or turbulent. In laminar flow, the exchange of miscible fluids flowing parallel to each other is due to diffusion, and is thus slow. This characteristic has been harnessed to produce stable gradients of small molecules within fluid streams. Rather than using a single liquid phase, it is also possible to use two liquid phases in order to generate droplets. The most common method for generating droplets includes the flow of an aqueous stream perpendicular to an oil stream. When these two streams meet at a T-junction, uniform, aqueous droplets are formed that are surrounded by an oil phase. Depending upon the geometry of the microfluidic device as well as the flow rates used, droplets can also be formed using a flow focusing device.

Microfluidics has a vast potential for single-molecule studies. In order to detect single molecules, it is often necessary to enhance or amplify a signal of interest. In bulk methods solutions, an amplified signal from a single molecule will continually be diluted to below the detection limit of nearly every fluorophore or other signal read-out. In small features rendered possible through microfluidics, however, the amplification of a single molecule will be confined within a volume ranging anywhere from nanoliters to picoliters. An amplified signal has the potential to grow in intensity above the limit of detection in these small volumes, thus allowing for single-molecule studies. The versatility in microfluidic device design and experimental execution combined with the unique size advantages of microfluidics provides nearly endless possibilities for its use as a chemical biology tool. With the advancement of nanofluidic technologies, the combined capabilities of microfluidics and nanofluidics could provide the necessary framework for important biological discoveries using chemical biology tools.

== See also ==
- Microfluidic Modulation Spectroscopy
