= Impedance pump =

An impedance pump is a valveless pump consisting of an elastic tube connected on both ends to an inelastic tube. Tapping the end of a tube will cause flow of liquid inside the system.

Very small versions of an impedance pump -- a micro impedance pump -- can be used as a micropump for lab-on-a-chip active microfluidics.
