= Micropump =

A Ti–Cr–Pt tube (~40 μm long) releases oxygen bubbles when immersed in hydrogen peroxide (catalytic decomposition). Polystyrene spheres (1 μm diameter) were added to study the flow kinetics.

Electrochemical micropump activating the flow of human blood through a 50×100 μm pipe.

Micropumps are devices that can control and manipulate small fluid volumes. Although any kind of small pump is often referred to as a micropump, a more accurate definition restricts this term to pumps with functional dimensions in the micrometer range. Such pumps are of special interest in microfluidic research, and have become available for industrial product integration in recent years. Their miniaturized overall size, potential cost and improved dosing accuracy compared to existing miniature pumps fuel the growing interest for this innovative kind of pump.

== Introduction and history ==
First true micropumps were reported in the mid-1970s, but attracted interest only in the 1980s, when Jan Smits and Harald Van Lintel developed MEMS micropumps. Most of the fundamental MEMS micropump work was done in the 1990s. More recently, efforts have been made to design non-mechanical micropumps that are functional in remote locations due to their non-dependence on external power.

A diagram showing how three microvalves in series can be used to displace fluid. In step (A), fluid is pulled from the inlet into the first valve. Steps (B) – (E) move the fluid to the final valve, before the fluid is expelled towards the outlet in step (F).

== Types and technology ==
Within the microfluidic world, physical laws are different. As an example, volumetric forces, such as weight or inertia, often become negligible, whereas surface forces can dominate fluidical behaviour, especially when gas inclusion in liquids is present. With only a few exceptions, micropumps rely on micro-actuation principles, which can reasonably be scaled up only to a certain size.

Micropumps can be grouped into mechanical and non-mechanical devices. Mechanical systems contain moving parts, which are usually actuation and microvalve membranes or flaps. The driving force can be generated by utilizing piezoelectric, electrostatic, thermo-pneumatic, pneumatic or magnetic effects. Non-mechanical pumps function with electro-hydrodynamic, electro-osmotic, electrochemical or ultrasonic flow generation, just to name a few of the actuation mechanisms that are currently studied.

=== Mechanical micropumps ===
==== Diaphragm micropumps ====
A diaphragm micropump uses the repeated actuation of a diaphragm to drive a fluid. The membrane is positioned above a main pump valve, which is centered between inlet and outlet microvalves. When the membrane is deflected upwards through some driving force, fluid is pulled into the inlet valve into the main pump valve. The membrane is then lowered, expelling the fluid through the outlet valve. This process is repeated to pump fluid continuously.

===== Piezoelectric micropumps =====
Piezoelectric micropump is one of the most common type of displacement reciprocating diaphragm pumps. Piezoelectric driven micropumps rely on electromechanical property of piezo ceramic to deform in response to applied voltage. Piezoelectric disk attached to the membrane causes diaphragm deflection driven by the external axial electric field thus expanding and contracting the chamber of the micropump. This mechanical strain results in pressure variation in the chamber, which causes inflow and outflow of the fluid. The flow rate is controlled by the polarization limit of the material and the voltage applied on the piezo. In comparison with other actuation principles piezoelectric actuation enables high stroke volume, high actuation force and fast mechanical response, though requiring comparatively high actuation voltage and complex mounting procedure of the piezo ceramic.

The smallest piezoelectric micropump with dimensions of 3.5x3.5x0.6 mm^{3} was developed by Fraunhofer EMFT the world-renowned research organization with focus on MEMS and Microsystem technologies. The micropump consists of three silicon layers, one of which as a pump diaphragm confines the pump chamber from above, while two others represent middle valve chip and bottom valve chip. Openings of the passive flap valves at the inlet and outlet are oriented according to the flow direction. The pump diaphragm expands with application of a negative voltage to the piezo thus creating negative pressure to suck the fluid into the pump chamber. While positive voltage vice versa drives the diaphragm down, which results in overpressure opening outlet valve and forcing the fluid out of the chamber.

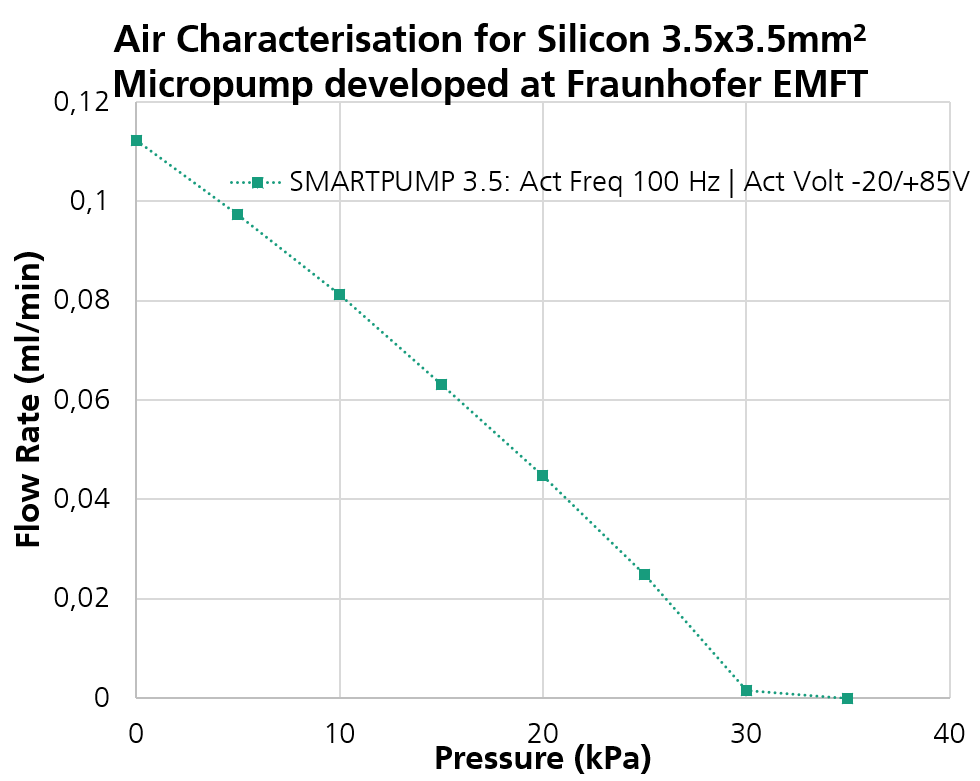
Back pressure performance of 3.5x3.5mm^{2} silicon piezoelectric driven micropump

Openings of the passive flap valves at the inlet and outlet are oriented according to the flow direction. The pump diaphragm expands with application of a negative voltage to the piezo thus creating negative pressure to suck the fluid into the pump chamber in supply mode. While positive voltage drives the diaphragm down, which results in opening outlet valve due to overpressure in pump mode.

Currently mechanical micropump technology extensively uses Silicon and Glass based micromachining processes for fabrication. Among the common microfabrication processes, the following techniques can be named: photolithography, anisotropic etching, surface micromachining and bulk micromachining of silicon. Silicon micromachining has numerous advantages that facilitate the technology widespread in high performance applications as, for example, in drug delivery. Thus, silicon micromachining allows high geometric precision and long-term stability, since mechanically moving parts, e.g. valve flaps, do not exhibit wear and fatigue. As an alternative to silicon polymer-based materials like PDMS, PMMA, PLLA, etc. can be used due to the superior strength, enhanced structural properties, stability and inexpensiveness. Silicon micropumps at Fraunhofer EMFT are manufactured by silicon micromachining technology. Three monocrystalline silicon wafers (100 oriented) are structured by doublesided lithography and etched by silicon wet etching (using potassium hydroxide solution KOH). The connection between the structured wafer layers is realized by silicon fusion bond. This bonding technology needs very smooth surfaces (roughness lower than 0.3 nm) and very high temperatures (up to 1100 °C) to perform a direct silicon–silicon bond between the wafer layers. Absence of the bonding layer allows definition of the vertical pump design parameters. Additionally, the bonding layer might be affected by the pumped medium.

The compression ratio of the micropump as one of the critical performance indicator is defined as the ratio between the stroke volume, i.e. fluid volume displaced by the pump membrane over the course of the pump cycle, and the dead volume, i.e. the minimum fluid volume remaining in the pump chamber in pumping mode.

$\varepsilon = \bigtriangleup V/ V_0$

The compression ratio defines the bubble tolerance and the counter pressure capability of the micropumps. Gas bubbles within chamber hinder micropump operation as due to the damping properties of the gas bubbles the pressure peaks (∆P) in the pump chamber decreases, while due to the surface properties the critical pressure (∆P_{crit}) that opens passive valves increases. The compression ratio of Fraunhofer EMFT micropumps reaches the value of 1, which implies self-priming capability and bubble tolerance even at challenging outlet pressure conditions. Large compression ratio is achieved thanks to special patented technique of piezo mounting, when electrical voltage is applied on the electrodes on the top and bottom of the piezoelectric ceramic during the curing process of the adhesive used for the piezo mounting. Considerable reduction of the dead volume resulted from predeflected actuators along with shallow fabricated pump chamber heights increases the compression ratio.

==== Peristaltic micropumps ====
A peristaltic micropump is a micropump composed of at least three microvalves in series. These three valves are opened and closed sequentially in order to pull fluid from the inlet to the outlet in a process known as peristalsis.

=== Non-mechanical micropumps ===
==== Valveless micropumps ====
Static valves are defined as valves which have fixed geometry without any moving parts. These valves provide flow rectification through addition of energy (active) or inducing desired flow behavior by fluid inertia (passive). Two most common types of static geometry passive valves are Diffuser-Nozzle Elements and Tesla valves. Micropumps having nozzle-diffuser elements as flow rectification device are commonly known as Valveless Micropumps.

==== Capillary pumps ====
In microfluidics, capillary pumping plays an important role because the pumping action does not require external actuation power. Glass capillaries and porous media, including nitrocellulose paper and synthetic paper, can be integrated into microfluidic chips. Capillary pumping is widely used in lateral flow testing. Recently, novel capillary pumps, with a constant pumping flow rate independent of the liquid viscosity and surface energy, were developed, which have a significant advantage over the traditional capillary pump (of which the flow behaviour is Washburn behaviour, namely the flow rate is not constant) because their performance does not depend on the sample viscosity.

==== Chemically powered pumps ====
Chemically powered non-mechanical pumps have been fabricated by affixing nanomotors to surfaces, driving fluid flow through chemical reactions. A wide variety of pumping systems exist including biological enzyme based pumps, organic photocatalyst pumps, and metal catalyst pumps. These pumps generate flow through a number of different mechanisms including self-diffusiophoresis, electrophoresis, bubble propulsion and the generation of density gradients. Moreover, these chemically powered micropumps can be used as sensors for the detection of toxic agents. Recently, a combination of enzyme-based pumps has been used to enhance, suppress, and change the directionality of fluid flow.

==== Light-powered pumps ====
Another class of non-mechanical pumping is light-powered pumping. Certain nanoparticles are able to convert light from a UV source to heat which generates convective pumping. These kinds of pumps are possible with titanium dioxide nanoparticles and the speed of pumping can be controlled by both the intensity of the light source and the concentration of particles.

== Applications ==
Micropumps have potential industrial applications, such as delivery of small amounts of glue during manufacturing processes, and biomedical applications, including portable or implanted drug delivery devices. Bio-inspired applications include a flexible electromagnetic micropump using magnetorheological elastomer to replace lymphatic vessels. Chemically powered micropumps also demonstrate potential for applications in chemical sensing in terms of detecting chemical warfare agents and environmental hazards, such as mercury and cyanide.

Considering contemporary state of air pollution one of the most promising applications for micropump lies in enhancement of gas and particulate matter sensors for monitoring personal air quality. Thanks to MEMS fabrication technology, gas sensors based on MOS, NDIR, electrochemical principles could be miniaturized to fit portable devices as well as smartphones and wearables. Application of the Fraunhofer EMFT piezoelectric micropump reduces reaction time of the sensor up to 2 seconds through fast sampling of the ambient air. This is explained by the fast convection that takes place when micropump drives the air towards the sensor, while in absence of the micropump due to slow diffusion sensor response is delayed for several minutes. The current alternative to the micropump – the fan – has numerous drawbacks. Unable to achieve substantial negative pressure fan cannot overcome pressure drop at the filter diaphragm. Further, the gas molecules and particles can easily re-adhere to the sensor surface and its housing, which in time results in sensor drift.

Additionally inbuilt micropump facilitates sensor regeneration and thus resolves saturation issues by expelling gas molecules out of the sensor surface. Breath analysis is related field of use for the gas sensor that is empowered by micropump. Micropump can advance remote diagnostic and monitoring of gastrointestinal tract and pulmonary diseases, diabetes, cancer etc. by means of portable devices within telemedicine programs.

The promising application for MEMS micropumps lies in drug delivery systems for diabetes-, tumor-, hormone-, pain and ocular therapy in forms of ultra-thin patches, targeted delivery within implantable systems or intelligent pills. Piezoelectric MEMS micropumps can replace traditional peristaltic or syringe pumps for intravenous, subcutaneous, arterial, ocular drug injection. Drug delivery application does not require high flow rates, however, the micropumps are supposed to be precise in delivering small doses and demonstrate back pressure independent flow. Due to biocompatibility and miniature size, silicon piezoelectric micropump can be implanted on the eyeball to treat glaucoma or phthisis. Since under these conditions the eye loses its ability to ensure outflow or production of aqueous humour, the implanted micropump developed by Fraunhofer EMFT with the flow rate of 30 μL/s facilitates proper flow of the fluid without restricting or creating any inconvenience to the patient. Another health issue to be solved by micropump is bladder incontinence. Artificial sphincter technology based on the titanium micropump ensures continence by automatically adjusting the pressure during laughter or coughing. The urethra is opened and closed by means of a fluid-filled sleeve that is regulated by the micropump.

Micropump can facilitate scent scenario for consumer, medical, defense, first responder applications etc. to enhance the effect of with ubiquitous picture scenarios (movies) and sound scenarios (music). Microdosing device with several scent reservoirs that are mounted near the nose can release 15 different scent impressions in 1 min. Advantage of the micropump lies in the possibility to smell sequence of scents without different odors being mixed. The system ensures an appropriate dose of the scent to be detected by the user only as soon as scent molecules are delivered. Numerous applications are possible with micropump for scent-dosing: tasters training (wine, food), learning programs, psychotherapy, anosmia treatment, first responder training etc. to facilitate full immersion in the desired environment.

Within analytical systems, the micropump can be for lab-on-chip applications, HPLC and Gas Chromatography systems etc. For the latter micropumps are required to ensure accurate delivery and flow of gases. Since the compressibility of the gases is challenging, the micropump must possess high compression ratio.

Among other applications, the following fields can be named: dosage systems for small quantity of lubricants, fuel dosing systems, micro pneumatics, micro hydraulic systems and dosage systems in production processes, liquid handling (cushion pipettes, microliter plates).

== See also ==
- Electroosmotic pump
- Glossary of fuel cell terms
- Impedance pump
- microvalve
