= Integrated fluidic circuit =

Type of integrated circuit using fluids

Integrated fluidic circuits (IFC) is a type of integrated circuit utilizing fluidics and the traditional microelectronics found in an integrated circuit. One company that produces these circuits for use in biology is Standard Biotools.

== See also ==
- Microfluidics
