= Induced-charge electrokinetics =

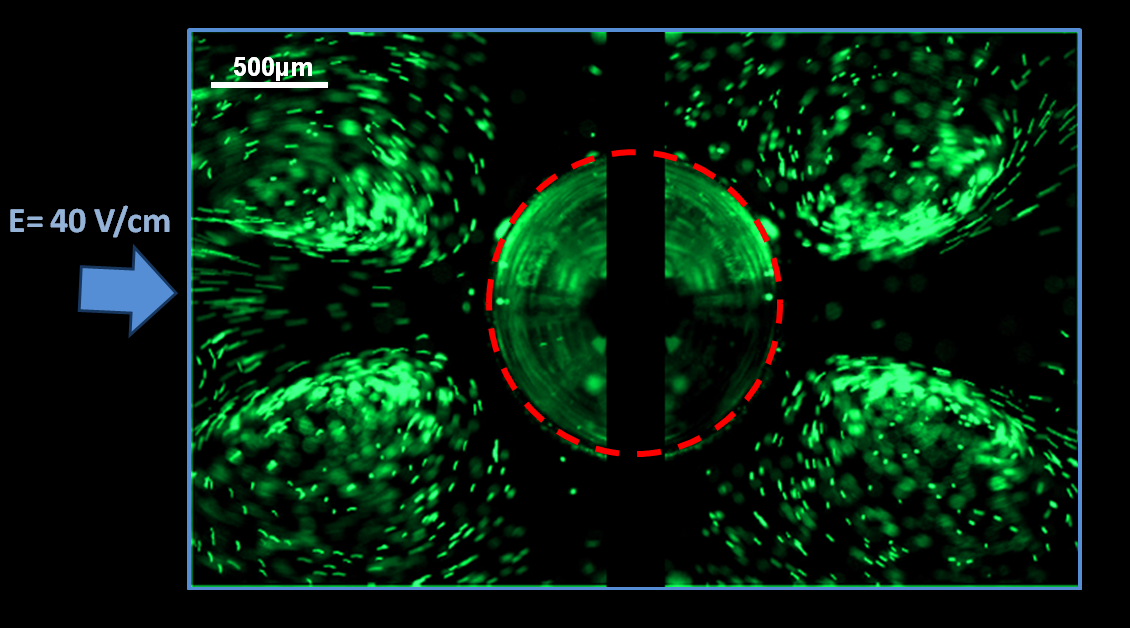
visualized induced-charge electrokinetic flow pattern around a carbon-steel sphere (diameter = 1.2 mm). Four induced vortices are shown using fluorescent particles with a diameter of 1.90 μm. The DC electric field is applied from left to right and equals 40V/cm. The dashed line represents the particle boundary. The image is captured by TE2000-E Nikon microscope at t = 2s.

Induced-charge electrokinetics in physics is the electrically driven fluid flow and particle motion in a liquid electrolyte. Consider a metal particle (which is neutrally charged but electrically conducting) in contact with an aqueous solution in a chamber/channel. If different voltages apply to the end of this chamber/channel, electric field will generate in this chamber/channel. This applied electric field passes through this metal particle and causes the free charges inside the particle migrate under the skin of particle. As a result of this migration, the negative charges move to the side which is close to the positive (or higher) voltage while the positive charges move to the opposite side of the particle. These charges under the skin of the conducting particle attract the counter-ions of the aqueous solution; thus, the electric double layer (EDL) forms around the particle. The EDL sign on the surface of the conducting particle changes from positive to negative and the distribution of the charges varies along the particle geometry. Due to these variations, the EDL is non-uniform and has different signs. Thus, the induced zeta potential around the particle, and consequently slip velocity on the surface of the particle, vary as a function of the local electric field. Differences in magnitude and direction of slip velocity on the surface of the conducting particle effects the flow pattern around this particle and causes micro vortices. Yasaman Daghighi and Dongqing Li, for the first time, experimentally illustrated these induced vortices around a 1.2 mm diameter carbon-steel sphere under the 40V/cm direct current (DC) external electric filed. Chenhui Peng et al. also experimentally showed the patterns of electro-osmotic flow around an Au sphere when alternating current (AC) is involved (E=10mV/μm, f=1 kHz). Electrokinetics here refers to a branch of science related to the motion and reaction of charged particles to the applied electric filed and its effects on its environment. It is sometimes referred as non-linear electrokinetic phenomena as well.

== History ==
Levich is one of the pioneers in induced-charge electrokinetic field. He calculated the perturbed slip profile around a conducting particle in contact with electrolyte. He also theoretically predicted that vortices induced around this particle once the electric filed is applied.

== Induced vortices around a conducting particle ==
The size and strength of the induced vortices around a conducting particle have direct relationship with the applied electric filed and also the size of the conducted surface. This phenomenon is experimentally and numerically proven by several studies. The vortices grow as the external electric field increases and generate "sinkhole" at the center of the each vortex while circulates the fluid faster. It is demonstrated that increasing the size of the conducting surface forms bigger induced vortices to the point that geometry does not limits this grows.

== Applications ==
The induced vortices have many applications in various aspects of electrokinetic microfluidics. There are many micro-mixers that are designed and fabricated based on the existence of their induced vortices in the microfluidics devices. Such micro-mixers which are used for biochemical, medicine, biology applications has no mechanical parts and only use conducting surfaces to generate induced vortices to mix the different fluid streams.

This phenomenon even is used to trap the micron and submicron particles floating in flow inside a micro-channel. This method can be used to manipulate, detect, handle, and concentrate cells and virus in biomedical field; or, for colloidal particle assembly.

In addition the induced vortices around the conducting surfaces in a microfluidic system can be used as a micro-valve, micro-actuator, micro-motor and micro-regulator to control the direction and manipulation.

== See also ==
- Diffusiophoresis
- Electro-osmosis
- Electrophoresis
- Lab-on-a-chip
- Surface charge
