= Microvalve =

Component that regulates flow between two fluidic ports

A microvalve is a microscale valve, i.e. a microfluidic two-port component that regulates the flow between two fluidic ports. Microvalves are basic components in microfluidic devices, such as labs-on-a-chip, where they are used to control the fluidic transport. During the period from 1995 to 2005, many microelectromechanical systems-based microvalves were developed.

Microvalves found today can be roughly categorized as active microvalves and passive microvalves. Based on the medium they control, microvalves can be divided into gas microvalves and liquid microvalves. Based on their initial mode, microvalves can be divided into normally open, normally closed and bistable microvalves.

== Types ==
=== Active microvalves ===
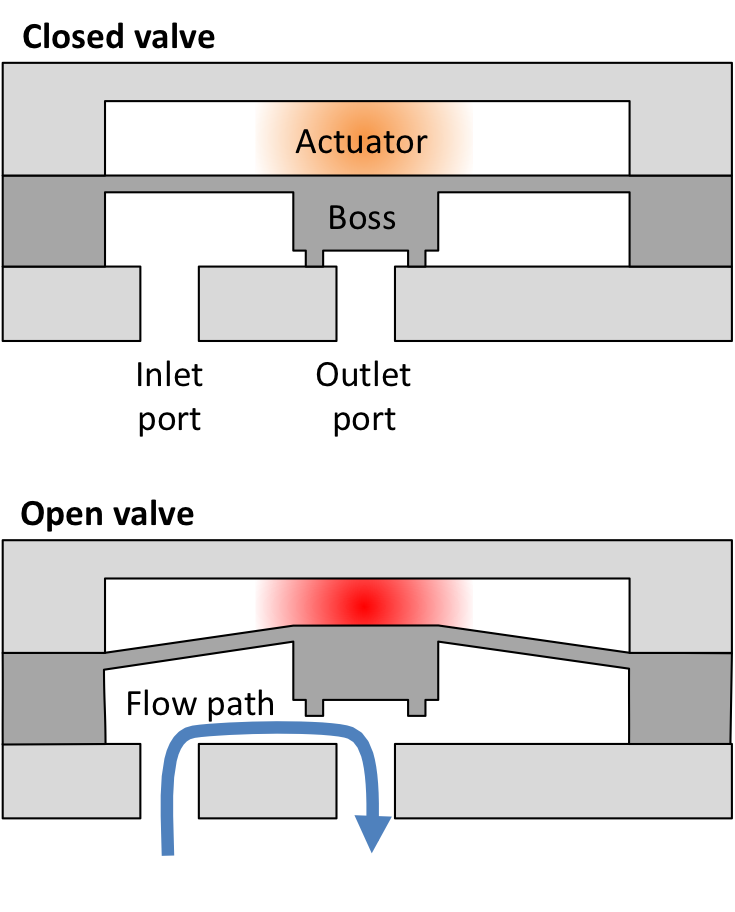
Cross-sectional sketch of an active microvalve

Active mechanical microvalves consist of mechanically movable membrane or boss structure, coupled to an actuation method, that can close off an orifice, thus blocking the flow path between the inlet and outlet ports. The actuator can either be an integrated magnetic, electrostatic, piezoelectric or thermal microactuator, a "smart" phase change, e.g. Shape-memory alloy, or rheological material, or an externally applied actuation mechanism, such as an external magnetic field or pneumatic source.

=== Passive microvalves ===
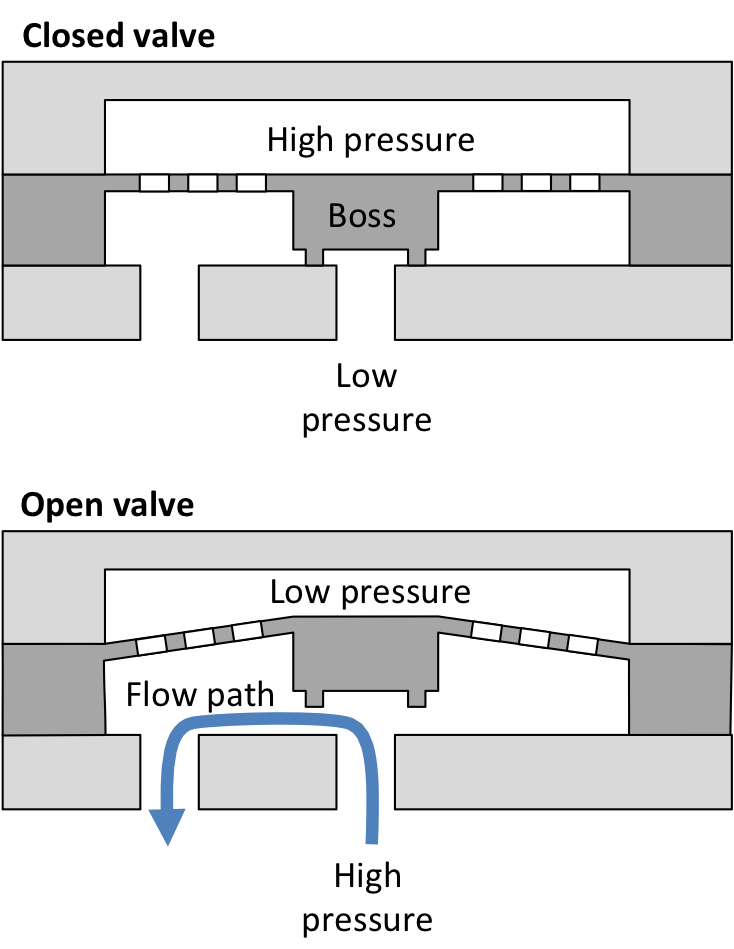
Schematic cross-section of a passive microvalve

Passive microvalves are valves for which the operational state, i.e. open or close, is determined by the fluid they control. Most common passive microvalves are flap valves, membrane microvalves and ball microvalves.

== Applications ==
=== Gas microvalves ===
Controlling a gas flow with MEMS microvalves has the following general benefits: the integration of the actuation mechanism with the other microvalve components allows component miniaturization; and the small scale of the component results in a rapid response time and a low-power consumption. However, despite the potential for cost-efficient batch fabrication offered by microelectromechanical systems (MEMS) technologies, gas microvalves have so far failed to reach the critical cost-per-performance ratio needed for a wide adoption of this technology.

=== Check valves ===
Most check valves, are incorporated in inlets and outlets of reciprocal displacement micropumps, where they provide the liquid rectification needed for the valve to have a net pump flow in one direction.
