= Fluorochromasia =

Fluorochromasia (Greek flōr χρῶμα- Pronunciation: flu̇r·ō·krə′mā·zhə), is a cellular phenomenon characterized by immediate appearance of bright green fluorescence inside viable cells upon exposure to certain membrane-permeable fluorogenic substrates such as fluorescein diacetate, fluorescein dibutyrate and fluorescein dipropionate. The phenomenon is widely used to measure cellular viability of many different species including animals, plants, and microorganisms. Moreover, fluorochromasia has been observed within organs, embryos, and zebrafish. Fluorochromasia has many applications including histocompatibility testing, measurement of cytotoxic antibodies, in vitro chemo sensitivity testing of tumors, and fluorochrome intercellular translocation. It has been applied with plants, bacteria, mammalian oocytes, mouse embryos, and human tumor cells.

== History ==
In 1966, Rotman and Papermaster accidentally discovered fluorochromasia while studying intracellular enzymes using fluorogenic substrates. They studied its mode of action and presented a molecular model in which intracellular retention of fluorescein depends on the integrity of the cell membrane. Non- polar molecules of fluorescein-esters, such as fluorescein diacetate, readily enter the cell and are hydrolyzed by non-specific esterases producing fluorescein, as the polar compound. In viable cells, the intracellular fluorescein is unable to readily pass through the intact membrane (i.e., it leaks slowly), accumulating in the cytoplasm of the cell. Their model is illustrated in Figure 1.

Schematic diagram of fluorochromasia molecular mechanism
