= Microfluidic modulation spectroscopy =

Infrared spectroscopy technique

Microfluidic modulation spectroscopy (MMS) is an infrared spectroscopy technique that is used to characterize the secondary structure of proteins. Infrared (IR) spectroscopy is well known for this application. However, the lack of automation, repeatability and dynamic range of detection in conventional platforms such as FTIR, have been major limitations which have been addressed with the development of microfluidic modulation spectroscopy.

== Biophysical characterization analytical techniques ==
Circular dichroism spectroscopy (CD) is a technique for the characterization of secondary structure. CD is useful for α-helical protein analysis due to the intense signal α-helix structures provide in the CD region. Fourier-transform infrared spectroscopy (FTIR) secondary structure deconvolution is also used for multivariate analysis techniques including singular value decomposition, partial least squares, soft independent modeling of class analogy, and neural networks.

CD, like conventional FTIR, also has major drawbacks. Measurement needs to be carried out at low concentrations, typically at 0.5 mg/mL but down to as low as 0.1 mg/mL, which can undermine the resulting data. The presence of some excipients in the formulation buffer can also interfere with the measurements. CD and conventional FTIR also lack sensitivity in the characterization of biopharmaceuticals proteins such as immunoglobulins IgG1 and IgG2. Microfluidic modulation spectroscopy is an automated technique that overcomes these challenges of both FTIR and CD for use in biopharmaceutical product characterization.

== Applications ==
=== Higher order structure assessment ===
Characterization of protein higher order structures is routinely performed during the biologic product development life cycle. Because biological function is related to structure, it is important to establish that the biologic is manufactured with the expected structure (a monoclonal antibody is created with the expected β-sheet, α-helix, for example). It is also important to demonstrate that the structure is not significantly impacted by drug substance or drug product manufacturing changes that arise during product development. Microfluidic modulation spectroscopy’s sensitivity and accuracy, detects higher order structure change in the formulation and at the concentration of interest, without the need for dilution or deuteration. The technique provides information on which structural motifs in the protein molecule are changing, providing more guidance when developing stable protein molecules and formulations.

=== Biosimilarity ===
Biosimilar drug development is an important application for higher order structure comparisons. In analytical similarity studies, the higher order structure of the innovator product is compared to the biosimilar to establish similarity in the structures. Comparability and biosimilarity studies often use microfluidic modulation spectroscopy to assess the products for structural differences. The technique reveals very small conformational differences between different proteins, and provides information on where those differences occur. These capabilities make microfluidic modulation spectroscopy a powerful tool in the analysis and development of biosimilars.

=== Aggregation ===
Protein aggregation is the process by which proteins start to bind together under different conditions and formulations. If therapeutic proteins are to be safe and efficacious, their misfolding and aggregation behaviors must be well understood. Both upstream and downstream processing can cause aggregation, a common indicator of protein instability, which can result in a therapeutic product being unfit for launch.

Microfluidic modulation spectroscopy can measure previously undetectable changes in protein structural attributes, changes that are critical to drug efficacy and quality. It is one of the only techniques which can directly monitor the formation of aggregates due to its ability to measure intermolecular beta sheet structures.

=== Formulation development ===
A detailed understanding of the mechanisms of aggregation is essential to control stability and ensure a safe, effective drug product. A primary motivation in formulation is to understand these mechanisms, which is driven by high throughput analysis and intense information gathering.

Formulation scientists use a core set of analytical techniques to quantify the colloidal, chemical and conformational stability parameters that define the stability of a biotherapeutic. However, this is a toolset with widely recognized gaps, notably an inability to measure conformational difference with high reproducibility in clinically representative formulations. For reasons mentioned previously, microfluidic modulation spectroscopy provides the sample capacity through 96 well plate operation and technical capabilities to elucidate colloidal and chemical stability, lacking in existing techniques such as size exclusion chromatography (SEC), mass spectrometry and capillary electrophoresis.

=== Quality assurance (GMP/CFR compliant laboratories) ===
Effective quality testing acts as a safeguard of product quality, controlling critical changes in the structure of drug substances, drug products, raw materials, or excipients. Quality assurance (QA) is a systematic approach that establishes a set of guidelines for all facets of the manufacturing process that could affect product quality.

Biologic drugs are complex molecules that exhibit microheterogeneity, minor chemical variances such as glycan structural differences, deamidation, oxidation and glycation. Casting a wide analytical net helps establish the robust structure-function relationships that define the boundaries of unacceptable risk. The identification of all possible critical quality attributes (CQAs) underpin effective QA. Microfluidic modulation spectroscopy facilitates the measurement of secondary structure attributes of biopharmaceuticals in all stages of the manufacturing process. This helps establish quality parameters at stages not possible with traditional techniques.

=== Quantitation ===
The structure of proteins and how they behave in solution are affected by concentration. Accurate concentration quantitation yields better analysis and comparison of results between different proteins and formulations. There is no common analytical approach for quantitation due to the constraints of traditional techniques (e.g. the limited dynamic range of traditional spectroscopic tools (for example limited resolution and detector linearity). Because the sample absorbance is targeted to a very limited dynamic range, this forces scientists to make extra steps to adjust either the sample concentration or the cell path length to achieve accurate protein quantitation.

Microfluidic modulation spectroscopy provides direct, label free protein quantitation over a wide concentration range and is more selective than traditional spectroscopy instrumentation, with less susceptibility to interferences. Microfluidic modulation spectroscopy increases sensitivity and significantly reduces the errors common with conventional spectroscopy.

== Components ==
Microfluidic modulation spectroscopy features a tunable mid-infrared quantum cascade laser to generate an optical beam that is 1000 times brighter than those used in conventional FTIR. This enables the measurement of samples that are substantially more concentrated than possible with other techniques, and the use of simpler detectors with no requirement for nitrogen cooling. The laser is run in continuous wave mode to generate a very high resolution (< 0.001 cm-1 linewidth), low noise beam with minimal stray light that is focused through a microfluidic transmission cell with a short (25 μm) optical path length onto a thermo-electrically cooled mercury cadmium tellurium (MCT) detector. This optical configuration delivers high sensitivity measurement over a concentration range of 0.1 – 200 mg/mL for structural characterization and down to 0.01 mg/mL for protein quantitation giving microfluidic modulation spectroscopy a far wider dynamic range than alternative protein characterization techniques.

In microfluidic modulation spectroscopy, the sample (protein-in-buffer) solution and a matching buffer reference stream are introduced into the transmission cell under continuous flow and then rapidly modulated (1-10 Hz) across the laser beam path to produce nearly drift-free, background compensated, differential scans of the Amide I band. The complete optical system is sealed and purged with dry air to minimize any interference from atmospheric water vapor which absorbs across the 2000 – 1300 cm-1 wavenumber range and can therefore compromise the use of IR spectroscopy for protein characterization. Advanced signal processing technology is the third key element of the instrument and converts the raw spectra into fractional contribution data for specific motifs of secondary structure, providing a structural fingerprint of the protein.
