= Microfluidics =

Interdisciplinary science

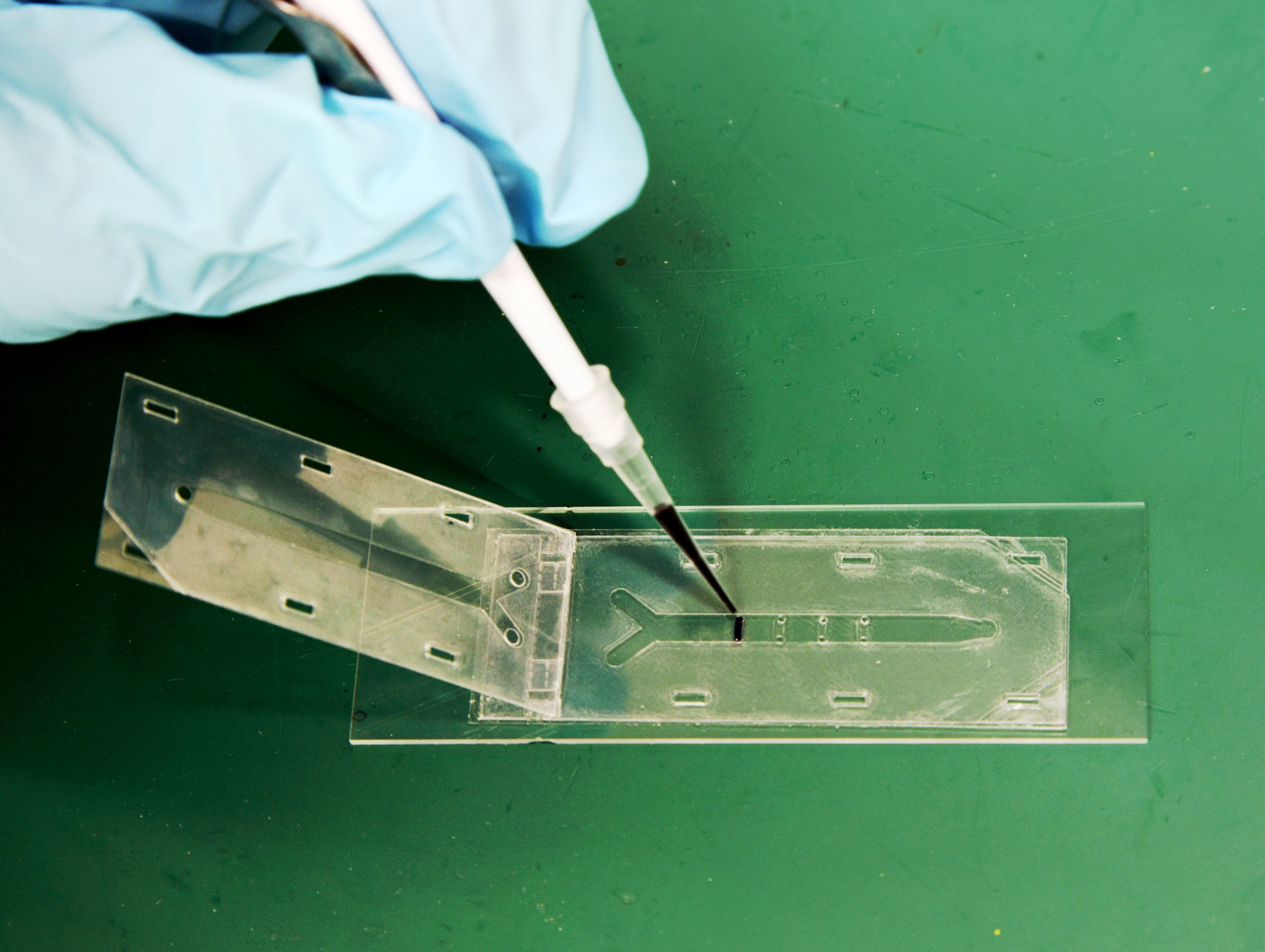
NIST researchers have combined a glass slide, plastic sheets and double-sided tape to create an inexpensive and simple-to-build microfluidic device for exposing an array of cells to different concentrations of a chemical

Microfluidics refers to a system that manipulates a small amount of fluids (10^{−9} to 10^{−18} liters) using small channels with sizes of ten to hundreds of micrometres. It is a multidisciplinary field that involves molecular analysis, molecular biology, and microelectronics. It has practical applications in the design of systems that process low volumes of fluids to achieve multiplexing, automation, and high-throughput screening. Microfluidics emerged in the beginning of the 1980s and is used in the development of inkjet printheads, DNA chips, lab-on-a-chip technology, micro-propulsion, and micro-thermal technologies.

Typically microfluidic systems transport, mix, separate, or otherwise process fluids. Various applications rely on passive fluid control using capillary forces, in the form of capillary flow modifying elements, akin to flow resistors and flow accelerators. In some applications, external actuation means are additionally used for a directed transport of the media. Examples are rotary drives applying centrifugal forces for the fluid transport on the passive chips. Active microfluidics refers to the defined manipulation of the working fluid by active (micro) components such as micropumps or microvalves. Micropumps supply fluids in a continuous manner or are used for dosing. Microvalves determine the flow direction or the mode of movement of pumped liquids. Often, processes normally carried out in a lab are miniaturised on a single chip, which enhances efficiency and mobility, and reduces sample and reagent volumes.

Standardisation of microfluidics is actively promoted by the Microfluidics Association, which resulted in the creation of a number of standards by the International Organization for Standardization (ISO).

== Characteristics ==
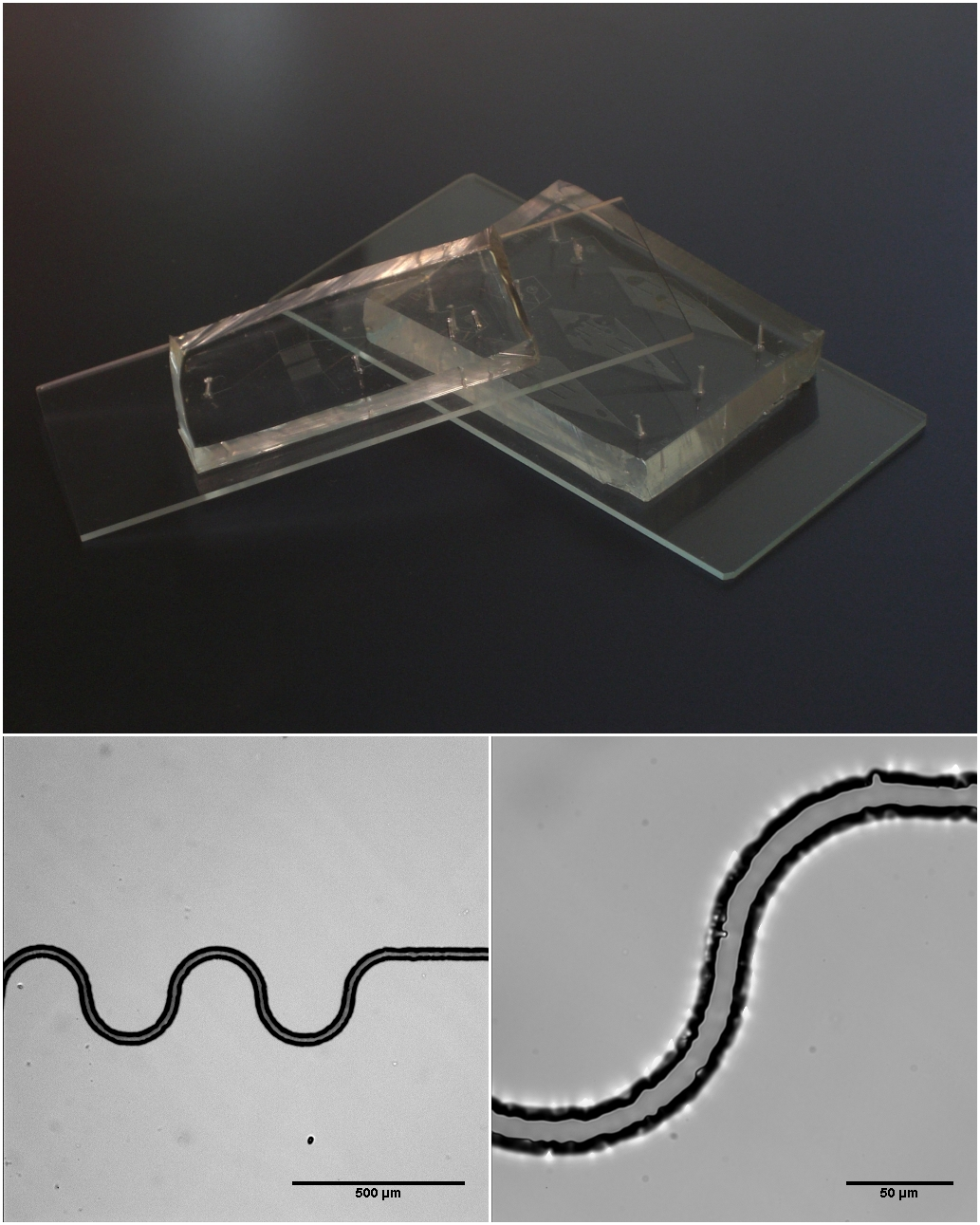
Silicone rubber and glass microfluidic devices. Top: a photograph of the devices. Bottom: Phase contrast micrographs of a serpentine channel ~15 μm wide

The behaviour of fluids at the microscale can differ from "macrofluidic" behaviour in that factors such as surface tension, energy dissipation, and fluidic resistance start to dominate the system, as opposed to inertial effects. Microfluidics studies how these behaviours change, and how they can be worked around, or exploited for new uses.

At small scales (channel size of around 100 nanometers to 500 micrometers) some unintuitive properties appear. In particular, the Reynolds number (which compares the effect of the momentum of a fluid to the effect of viscosity) can become very low. One consequence is co-flowing fluids do not necessarily mix in the traditional sense, as flow becomes laminar rather than turbulent; molecular transport between them must often be through diffusion.

High specificity of chemical and physical properties (concentration, pH, temperature, shear force, etc.) can also be ensured resulting in more uniform reaction conditions and higher grade products in single and multi-step reactions.

== Flow types ==
Microfluidic flows need only be constrained by geometrical length scale – the modalities and methods used to achieve such a geometrical constraint are highly dependent on the targeted application. Traditionally, microfluidic flows have been generated inside closed channels with the channel cross section being in the order of 10 μm x 10 μm. Each of these methods has its own associated techniques to maintain robust fluid flow which have matured over several years.

=== Open microchannels ===
The behavior of fluids and their control in open microchannels came into focus around 2005 and applied in air-to-liquid sample collection and chromatography. In open microfluidics, at least one boundary of the system is removed, exposing the fluid to air or another interface (i.e. liquid). Advantages of open microfluidics include accessibility to the flowing liquid for intervention, larger liquid-gas surface area, and minimized bubble formation. Another advantage of open microfluidics is the ability to integrate open systems with surface-tension driven fluid flow, which eliminates the need for external pumping methods such as peristaltic or syringe pumps. Open microfluidic devices are also easy and inexpensive to fabricate by milling, thermoforming, and hot embossing. In addition, open microfluidics eliminates the need to glue or bond a cover for devices, which could be detrimental to capillary flows. Examples of open microfluidics include open-channel microfluidics, rail-based microfluidics, paper-based, and thread-based microfluidics. Disadvantages to open systems include susceptibility to evaporation, contamination, and limited flow rate.

=== Continuous flow ===
Continuous flow microfluidics rely on the control of a steady state liquid flow through narrow channels or porous media predominantly by accelerating or hindering fluid flow in capillary elements. In paper based microfluidics, capillary elements can be achieved through the simple variation of section geometry. In general, the actuation of liquid flow is implemented either by external pressure sources, external mechanical pumps, integrated mechanical micropumps, or by combinations of capillary forces and electrokinetic mechanisms. Continuous-flow microfluidic operation is the mainstream approach because it is easy to implement and less sensitive to protein fouling problems. Continuous-flow devices are adequate for many well-defined and simple biochemical applications, and for certain tasks such as chemical separation, but they are less suitable for tasks requiring a high degree of flexibility or fluid manipulations. These closed-channel systems are inherently difficult to integrate and scale because the parameters that govern flow field vary along the flow path making the fluid flow at any one location dependent on the properties of the entire system. Permanently etched microstructures also lead to limited reconfigurability and poor fault tolerance capability.

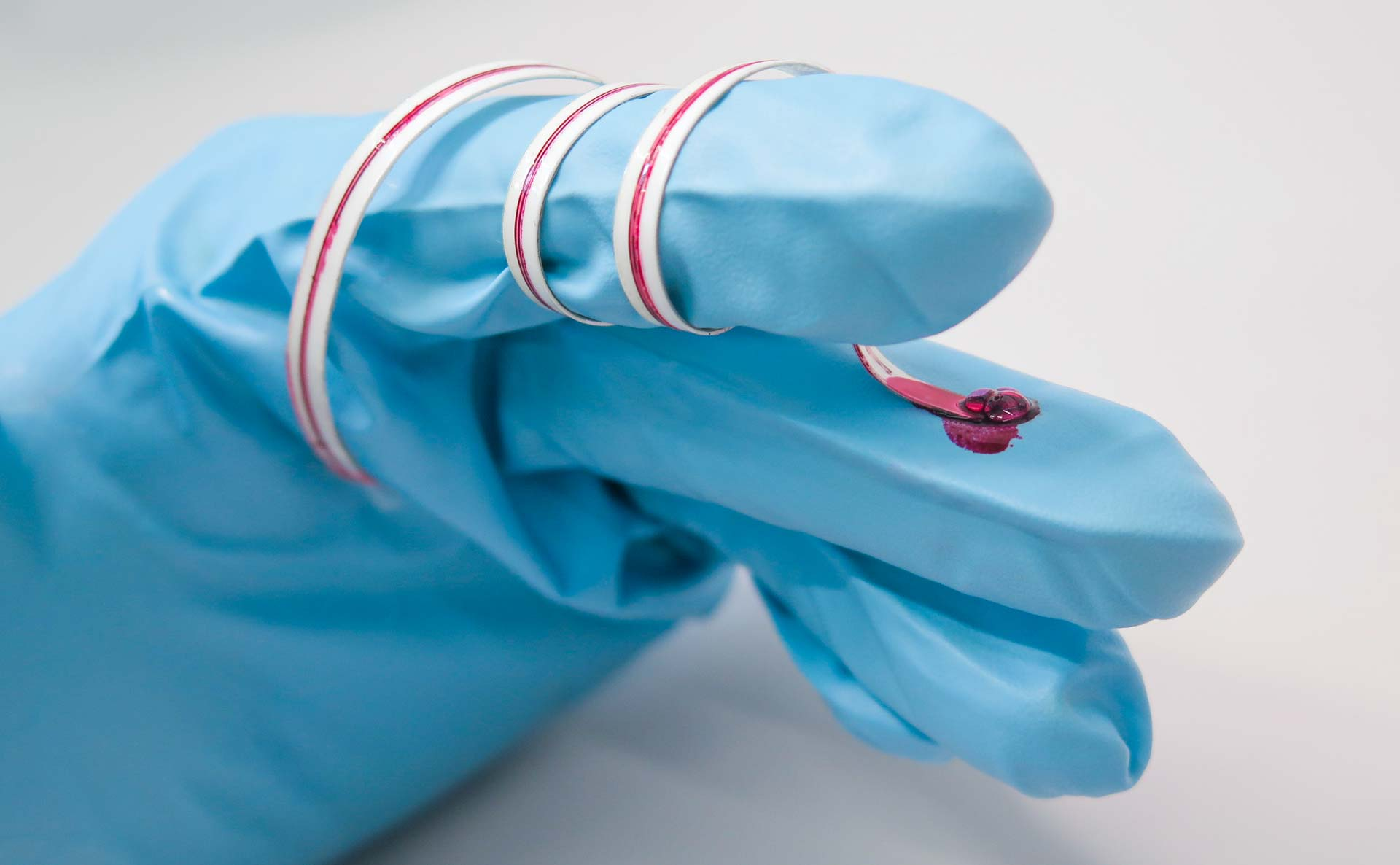
Micro fluid sensor

Process monitoring capabilities in continuous-flow systems can be achieved with highly sensitive microfluidic flow sensors based on MEMS technology, which offers resolutions down to the nanoliter range.

=== Droplet-based ===
High frame rate video showing microbubble pinch-off formation in a flow-focusing microfluidic device

Droplet-based microfluidics is differs from continuous microfluidics; droplet-based microfluidics manipulates discrete volumes of fluids in immiscible phases with low Reynolds number and laminar flow regimes. Interest in droplet-based microfluidics systems has been growing substantially in past decades. Microdroplets allow for handling miniature volumes (μL to fL) of fluids conveniently, provide better mixing, encapsulation, sorting, and sensing, and suit high throughput experiments. Exploiting the benefits of droplet-based microfluidics efficiently requires a deep understanding of droplet generation to perform various logical operations such as droplet manipulation, droplet sorting, droplet merging, and droplet breakup.

=== Digital ===
Alternatives to the above closed-channel continuous-flow systems include novel open structures, where discrete, independently controllable droplets are manipulated on a substrate using electrowetting. Following the analogy of digital microelectronics, this approach is referred to as digital microfluidics. Le Pesant et al. pioneered the use of electrocapillary forces to move droplets on a digital track. The "fluid transistor" pioneered by Cytonix also played a role. The technology was subsequently commercialised by Duke University. By using discrete unit-volume droplets, a microfluidic function can be reduced to a set of repeated basic operations, i.e., moving one unit of fluid over one unit of distance. This "digitisation" method facilitates the use of a hierarchical and cell-based approach for microfluidic biochip design. Therefore, digital microfluidics offers a flexible and scalable system architecture as well as high fault-tolerance capability. Moreover, because each droplet can be controlled independently, these systems also have dynamic reconfigurability, whereby groups of unit cells in a microfluidic array can be reconfigured to change their functionality during the concurrent execution of a set of bioassays. Although droplets are manipulated in confined microfluidic channels, since the control on droplets is not independent, it should not be confused as "digital microfluidics". One common actuation method for digital microfluidics is electrowetting-on-dielectric (EWOD). Many lab-on-a-chip applications have been demonstrated within the digital microfluidics paradigm using electrowetting.

=== Paper-based ===
Paper-based microfluidic devices are proposed to provide portable, cheap, and user-friendly medical diagnostic systems. Paper based microfluidics rely on the phenomenon of capillary penetration in porous media. To tune fluid penetration in porous substrates such as paper in two and three dimensions, the pore structure, wettability and geometry of the microfluidic devices can be controlled while the viscosity and evaporation rate of the liquid play a further significant role. Many such devices feature hydrophobic barriers on hydrophilic paper that passively transport aqueous solutions to outlets where biological reactions take place. Paper-based microfluidics are considered as portable point-of-care biosensors used in a remote setting where advanced medical diagnostic tools are not accessible. Current applications include portable glucose detection and environmental testing, with hopes of reaching areas that lack advanced medical diagnostic tools.

=== Particle detection ===
One potential application area involves particle detection in fluids. Particle detection of small fluid-borne particles down to about 1 μm in diameter is typically achieved using a Coulter counter, in which electrical signals are generated when a weakly-conducting fluid such as in saline water is passed through a small (~100 μm diameter) pore, so that an electrical signal is generated that is directly proportional to the ratio of the particle volume to the pore volume. The physics behind this is relatively simple, described in a classic paper by DeBlois and Bean, and the implementation first described in Coulter's original patent. This is the method used to e.g. size and count erythrocytes (red blood cells) as well as leukocytes (white blood cells) for standard blood analysis. The generic term for this method is resistive pulse sensing (RPS); Coulter counting is a trademark term. However, the RPS method does not work well for particles below 1 μm diameter, as the signal-to-noise ratio falls below the reliably detectable limit, set mostly by the size of the pore in which the analyte passes and the input noise of the first-stage amplifier.

The limit on the pore size in traditional RPS Coulter counters is set by the method used to make the pores, which while a trade secret, most likely uses traditional mechanical methods. This is where microfluidics can have an impact: The lithography-based production of microfluidic devices, or more likely the production of reusable molds for making microfluidic devices using a molding process, is limited to sizes much smaller than traditional machining. Critical dimensions down to 1 μm are easily fabricated, and with a bit more effort and expense, feature sizes below 100 nm can be patterned reliably as well. This enables the inexpensive production of pores integrated in a microfluidic circuit where the pore diameters can reach sizes of order 100 nm, with a concomitant reduction in the minimum particle diameters by several orders of magnitude.

As a result, there has been some university-based development of microfluidic particle counting and sizing with the accompanying commercialization of this technology. This method has been termed microfluidic resistive pulse sensing (MRPS).

=== Magnetophoresis ===
One application for microfluidic devices is the separation and sorting of different fluids or cell types. Microfluidic devices have been integrated with magnetophoresis: the migration of particles by a magnetic field. This can be accomplished by sending a fluid containing at least one magnetic component through a microfluidic channel that has a magnet positioned along the length of the channel. This creates a magnetic field inside the microfluidic channel which draws magnetically active substances towards it, effectively separating the magnetic and non-magnetic components of the fluid. This technique can be readily utilized in industrial settings where the fluid at hand already contains magnetically active material. For example, a handful of metallic impurities can find their way into certain consumable liquids, namely milk and other dairy products. Conveniently, in the case of milk, many of these metal contaminants exhibit paramagnetism. Therefore, before packaging, milk can be flowed through channels with magnetic gradients as a means of purifying out the metal contaminants.

Cell separations are of interest in microfluidics. First, a paramagnetic substance (usually micro/nanoparticles or a paramagnetic fluid) needs to be functionalized to target the cell type of interest. This can be accomplished by identifying a transmembranal protein unique to the cell type of interest and subsequently functionalizing magnetic particles with the complementary antigen or antibody. Once the magnetic particles are functionalized, they are dispersed in a cell mixture where they bind to only the cells of interest. The resulting cell/particle mixture can then be flowed through a microfluidic device with a magnetic field to separate the targeted cells from the rest.

Conversely, microfluidic-assisted magnetophoresis may be used to facilitate efficient mixing within microdroplets or plugs. To accomplish this, microdroplets are injected with paramagnetic nanoparticles and are flowed through a straight channel which passes through rapidly alternating magnetic fields. This causes the magnetic particles to be quickly pushed from side to side within the droplet and results in the mixing of the microdroplet contents. This eliminates the need for tedious engineering considerations that are necessary for traditional, channel-based droplet mixing. Other research has also shown that the label-free separation of cells may be possible by suspending cells in a paramagnetic fluid and taking advantage of the magneto-Archimedes effect. While this does eliminate the complexity of particle functionalization, more research is needed to fully understand the magneto-Archimedes phenomenon and how it can be used to this end. This is not an exhaustive list of the various applications of microfluidic-assisted magnetophoresis; the above examples merely highlight the versatility of this separation technique in both current and future applications.

== Applications ==
Microfluidic structures include micropneumatic systems, i.e. microsystems for the handling of off-chip fluids (liquid pumps, gas valves, etc.), and microfluidic structures for the on-chip handling of nanoliter (nl) and picoliter (pl) volumes. To date, the most successful commercial application of microfluidics is the inkjet printhead. Additionally, microfluidic manufacturing advances mean that makers can produce the devices in low-cost plastics such as polymethymethacrylate (PMMA), polystyrene, cyclic olefin polymer (COP) and polyvinyl chloride (PVC) and automatically verify part quality. Microfluidic devices are often first produced using fabrication methods such as soft lithography, micro milling or laser machining to validate microchannel designs before transitioning to scalable thermoplastic manufacturing processes such as injection molding.

Advances in microfluidics technology promise to improve molecular biology procedures for enzymatic analysis (e.g., glucose and lactate assays), DNA analysis (e.g., polymerase chain reaction and high-throughput sequencing), proteomics, and in chemical synthesis. Microfluidic biochips integrate assay operations such as detection, with sample pre-treatment and sample preparation.

A promising application area for biochips is clinical pathology, especially the point-of-care diagnosis of diseases. In addition, microfluidics-based devices, capable of continuous sampling and real-time testing of air/water samples for biochemical toxins and other dangerous pathogens, can serve as an always-on "bio-smoke alarm" for early warning.

Microfluidic technology has provide tools for biologists to control the cellular environment. Potential advantages of this technology for microbiology are listed below:

- General single cell studies including growth
- Mother machine
  Cellular aging: microfluidic devices such as the "mother machine" allow tracking of thousands of individual cells for many generations until they die
- Microenvironmental control: ranging from mechanical environment to chemical environment
- Precise spatiotemporal concentration gradients by incorporating multiple chemical inputs to a single device
- Force measurements of adherent cells or confined chromosomes: objects trapped in a microfluidic device can be directly manipulated using optical tweezers or other force-generating methods
- Confining cells and exerting controlled forces by coupling with external force-generation methods such as Stokes flow, optical tweezer, or controlled deformation of the PDMS (Polydimethylsiloxane) device
- Electric field integration
- Plant on a chip and plant tissue culture
- Antibiotic resistance: microfluidic devices can be used as heterogeneous environments for microorganisms. In a heterogeneous environment, it is easier for a microorganism to evolve. This can be useful for testing the acceleration of evolution of a microorganism / for testing the development of antibiotic resistance.
- Viral fusion: these devices also allow the study of the several steps and conditions required for viruses to bind and enter host cells. Information regarding efficiency, kinetics and specific steps of the binding and fusion processes can be obtained using microfluidic flow cells.
- Organ on a chip applications: For example organoids can be used to model diseases with cells derived from patients or they can be used to investigate the development of different tissues (for example the nervous system) in humans and other animals.

Some of these areas are further elaborated in the sections below:

=== DNA chips ===
Early biochips were based on the idea of a DNA microarray, e.g., the GeneChip DNAarray from Affymetrix, which is a piece of glass, plastic or silicon substrate, on which pieces of DNA (probes) are affixed in a microscopic array. Similar to a DNA microarray, a protein array is a miniature array where a multitude of different capture agents, most frequently monoclonal antibodies, are deposited on a chip surface; they are used to determine the presence and/or amount of proteins in biological samples, e.g., blood. A drawback of DNA and protein arrays is that they are neither reconfigurable nor scalable after manufacture. Digital microfluidics has been described as a means for carrying out Digital PCR.

=== Molecular biology ===
In addition to microarrays, biochips have been designed for two-dimensional electrophoresis, transcriptome analysis, and PCR amplification. Other applications include various electrophoresis and liquid chromatography applications for proteins and DNA, cell separation, in particular, blood cell separation, protein analysis, cell manipulation and analysis including cell viability analysis and microorganism capturing.

=== Evolutionary biology ===
By combining microfluidics with landscape ecology and nanofluidics, a nano/micro fabricated fluidic landscape can be constructed by building local patches of bacterial habitat and connecting them by dispersal corridors. The resulting landscapes can be used as physical implementations of an adaptive landscape, by generating a spatial mosaic of patches of opportunity distributed in space and time. The patchy nature of these fluidic landscapes allows for the study of adapting bacterial cells in a metapopulation system. The evolutionary ecology of these bacterial systems in these synthetic ecosystems allows for using biophysics to address questions in evolutionary biology.

=== Cell behavior ===
The ability to create precise and carefully controlled chemoattractant gradients motivates microfluidics as the ideal tool to study motility, chemotaxis and the ability to evolve or develop resistance to antibiotics in short timespans. These microorganisms include bacteria and the broad range of organisms that form the marine microbial loop, responsible for regulating much of the ocean's biogeochemistry.

Microfluidics has also greatly aided the study of durotaxis by facilitating the creation of durotactic (stiffness) gradients.

=== Cellular biophysics ===
By rectifying the motion of individual swimming bacteria, microfluidic structures can be used to extract mechanical motion from a population of motile bacterial cells. This way, bacteria-powered rotors can be built.

=== Optics ===
The merger of microfluidics and optics is typical known as optofluidics. Examples of optofluidic devices are tunable microlens arrays and optofluidic microscopes.

Microfluidic flow enables fast sample throughput, automated imaging of large sample populations, as well as 3D capabilities, or superresolution.

=== Photonics Lab on a Chip ===
Due to the increase in safety concerns and operating costs of common analytic methods (ICP-MS, ICP-AAS, and ICP-OES), the Photonics Lab on a Chip (PhLOC) is becoming an increasingly popular tool for the analysis of actinides and nitrates in spent nuclear waste. The PhLOC is based on the simultaneous application of Raman and UV-Vis-NIR spectroscopy, which allows for the analysis of more complex mixtures which contain several actinides at different oxidation states. Measurements made with these methods have been validated at the bulk level for industrial tests, and are observed to have a much lower variance at the micro-scale. This approach has been found to have molar extinction coefficients (UV-Vis) in line with known literature values over a comparatively large concentration span for 150 μL via elongation of the measurement channel, and obeys Beer's Law at the micro-scale for U(IV). Through the development of a spectrophotometric approach to analyzing spent fuel, an on-line method for measurement of reactant quantities is created, increasing the rate at which samples can be analyzed and thus decreasing the size of deviations detectable within reprocessing.

Through the application of the PhLOC, flexibility and safety of operational methods are increased. Since the analysis of spent nuclear fuel involves extremely harsh conditions, the application of disposable and rapidly produced devices (Based on castable and/or engravable materials such as PDMS, PMMA, and glass) is advantageous, although material integrity must be considered under specific harsh conditions. Through the usage of fiber optic coupling, the device can be isolated from instrumentation, preventing irradiative damage and minimizing the exposure of lab personnel to potentially harmful radiation, something not possible on the lab scale nor with the previous standard of analysis. The shrinkage of the device also allows for lower amounts of analyte to be used, decreasing the amount of waste generated and exposure to hazardous materials.

Expansion of the PhLOC to miniaturize research of the full nuclear fuel cycle is currently being evaluated, with steps of the PUREX process successfully being demonstrated at the micro-scale. Likewise, the microfluidic technology developed for the analysis of spent nuclear fuel is predicted to expand horizontally to analysis of other actinide, lanthanides, and transition metals with little to no modification.

=== High Performance Liquid Chromatography ===
High Performance Liquid Chromatography (HPLC) in the field of microfluidics comes in two different forms. Early designs included running liquid through the HPLC column then transferring the eluted liquid to microfluidic chips and attaching HPLC columns to the microfluidic chip directly. The early methods had the advantage of easier detection from certain machines like those that measure fluorescence. HPLC columns have been integrated into microfluidic chips. The main advantage of integrating HPLC columns into microfluidic devices is the smaller form factor that can be achieved, which allows for additional features to be combined within one microfluidic chip. Integrated chips can also be fabricated from multiple different materials, including glass and polyimide which are quite different from the standard material of PDMS used in many different droplet-based microfluidic devices. This is an important feature because different applications of HPLC microfluidic chips may call for different pressures. PDMS fails in comparison for high-pressure uses compared to glass and polyimide. High versatility of HPLC integration ensures robustness by avoiding connections and fittings between the column and chip. The ability to build off said designs in the future allows the field of microfluidics to continue expanding its potential applications.

The potential applications surrounding integrated HPLC columns within microfluidic devices have proven expansive over the last 10–15 years. The integration of such columns allows for experiments to be run where materials were in low availability or very expensive, like in biological analysis of proteins. This reduction in reagent volumes allows for new experiments like single-cell protein analysis, which due to size limitations of prior devices, previously came with great difficulty. The coupling of HPLC-chip devices with other spectrometry methods like mass-spectrometry allow for enhanced confidence in identification of desired species, like proteins. Microfluidic chips have also been created with internal delay-lines that allow for gradient generation to further improve HPLC, which can reduce the need for further separations. Some other practical applications of integrated HPLC chips include the determination of drug presence in a person through their hair and the labeling of peptides through reverse phase liquid chromatography.

=== Acoustic droplet ejection ===
Acoustic droplet ejection (ADE) uses a pulse of ultrasound to move low volumes of fluids (typically nanoliters or picoliters) without any physical contact. This technology focuses acoustic energy into a fluid sample to eject droplets as small as a millionth of a millionth of a litre (picoliter = 10^{−12} litre). ADE technology is a very gentle process, and it can be used to transfer proteins, high molecular weight DNA and live cells without damage or loss of viability. This feature makes the technology suitable for a wide variety of applications including proteomics and cell-based assays.

=== Fuel cells ===
Microfluidic fuel cells can use laminar flow to separate the fuel and its oxidant to control the interaction of the two fluids without the physical barrier that conventional fuel cells require.

=== Astrobiology ===
To understand the prospects for life to exist elsewhere in the universe, astrobiologists are interested in measuring the chemical composition of extraplanetary bodies. Because of their small size and wide-ranging functionality, microfluidic devices are suited for these remote sample analyses. From an extraterrestrial sample, the organic content can be assessed using microchip capillary electrophoresis and selective fluorescent dyes. These devices are capable of detecting amino acids, peptides, fatty acids, and simple aldehydes, ketones, and thiols. These analyses coupled together could allow detection of the key components of life, and inform the search for functioning extraterrestrial life.

=== Food science ===
Microfluidic techniques such as droplet microfluidics, paper microfluidics, and lab-on-a-chip are used in the realm of food science in a variety of categories. Research in nutrition, food processing, and food safety benefit from microfluidic technique because experiments can be done with less reagents.

Food processing requires the ability to enable shelf stability in foods, such as emulsions or additions of preservatives. Techniques such as droplet microfluidics are used to create emulsions that are more controlled and complex than those created by traditional homogenization due to the precision of droplets that is achievable. Using microfluidics for emulsions is also more energy efficient compared to homogenization in which "only 5% of the supplied energy is used to generate the emulsion, with the rest dissipated as heat" . Although these methods have benefits, they currently lack the ability to be produced at large scale that is needed for commercialization. Microfluidics are also used in research as they allow for innovation in food chemistry and food processing. An example in food engineering research is a novel micro-3D-printed device fabricated to research production of droplets for potential food processing industry use, particularly in work with enhancing emulsions.

Paper and droplet microfluidics allow for devices that can detect small amounts of unwanted bacteria or chemicals, making them useful in food safety and analysis. Paper-based microfluidic devices are often referred to as microfluidic paper-based analytical devices (μPADs) and can detect such things as nitrate, preservatives, or antibiotics in meat by a colorimetric reaction that can be detected with a smartphone. These methods are being researched because they use less reactants, space, and time compared to traditional techniques such as liquid chromatography. μPADs also make home detection tests possible, which is of interest to those with allergies and intolerances. In addition to paper-based methods, research demonstrates droplet-based microfluidics shows promise in drastically shortening the time necessary to confirm viable bacterial contamination in agricultural waters in the domestic and international food industry.

=== Personalized cancer treatment ===
Personalized cancer treatment is a tuned method based on the patient's diagnosis and background. Microfluidic technology offers sensitive detection with higher throughput, as well as reduced time and costs. For personalized cancer treatment, tumor composition and drug sensitivities are very important.

A patient's drug response can be predicted based on the status of biomarkers, or the severity and progression of the disease can be predicted based on the atypical presence of specific cells. Drop-qPCR is a droplet microfluidic technology in which droplets are transported in a reusable capillary and alternately flow through two areas maintained at different constant temperatures and fluorescence detection. It can be efficient with a low contamination risk to detect Her2. A digital droplet‐based PCR method can be used to detect the KRAS mutations with TaqMan probes, to enhance detection of the mutative gene ratio. In addition, accurate prediction of postoperative disease progression in breast or prostate cancer patients is essential for determining post-surgery treatment. A simple microfluidic chamber, coated with a carefully formulated extracellular matrix mixture is used for cells obtained from tumor biopsy after 72 hours of growth and a thorough evaluation of cells by imaging.

Microfluidics is also suitable for circulating tumor cells (CTCs) and non-CTCs liquid biopsy analysis. Beads conjugate to anti‐epithelial cell adhesion molecule (EpCAM) antibodies for positive selection in the CTCs isolation chip (iCHIP). CTCs can also be detected by using the acidification of the tumor microenvironment and the difference in membrane capacitance. CTCs are isolated from blood by a microfluidic device, and are cultured on-chip, which can be a method to capture more biological information in a single analysis. For example, it can be used to test the cell survival rate of 40 different drugs or drug combinations. Tumor‐derived extracellular vesicles can be isolated from urine and detected by an integrated double‐filtration microfluidic device; they also can be isolated from blood and detected by electrochemical sensing method with a two‐level amplification enzymatic assay.

Tumor materials can directly be used for detection through microfluidic devices. To screen primary cells for drugs, it is often necessary to distinguish cancerous cells from non-cancerous cells. A microfluidic chip based on the capacity of cells to pass small constrictions can sort the cell types, metastases. Droplet‐based microfluidic devices have the potential to screen different drugs or combinations of drugs, directly on the primary tumor sample with high accuracy. To improve this strategy, the microfluidic program with a sequential manner of drug cocktails, coupled with fluorescent barcodes, is more efficient. Another advanced strategy is detecting growth rates of single-cell by using suspended microchannel resonators, which can predict drug sensitivities of rare CTCs.

Microfluidics devices also can simulate the tumor microenvironment, to help to test anticancer drugs. Microfluidic devices with 2D or 3D cell cultures can be used to analyze spheroids for different cancer systems (such as lung cancer and ovarian cancer), and are essential for multiple anti-cancer drugs and toxicity tests. This strategy can be improved by increasing the throughput and production of spheroids. For example, one droplet-based microfluidic device for 3D cell culture produces 500 spheroids per chip. These spheroids can be cultured longer in different surroundings to analyze and monitor. The other advanced technology is organs‐on‐a‐chip, and it can be used to simulate several organs to determine the drug metabolism and activity based on vessels mimicking, as well as mimic pH, oxygen... to analyze the relationship between drugs and human organ surroundings.

One strategy relevant to single-cell chromatin immunoprecipitation (ChiP)‐Sequencing is droplets, which operates by combining droplet‐based single cell RNA sequencing with DNA‐barcoded antibodies, possibly to explore the tumor heterogeneity by the genotype and phenotype to select the personalized anti-cancer drugs and prevent the cancer relapse.

=== Environmental Pollution ===
Other than medical and biological applications, microfluidics has been used for pollution detection and control. Although microfluidics is exclusively used for micron-sized particles, a novel lab-on-a-chip that integrates nano-sized particle aggregation with spiral inertial microfluidics for rapid detection of nanoplastics and very small microplastics from the environment.

=== Capillary electrophoresis ===
One significant advancement in the field is the development of integrated capillary electrophoresis (CE) systems on microchips, as demonstrated by Z. Hugh Fan and D. Jed. Harrison. They created a planar glass chip incorporating a sample injector and separation channels using micromachining techniques. This setup allowed for the rapid separation of amino acids in just a few seconds, achieving high separation efficiencies with up to 6800 theoretical plates. The use of high electric fields, possible due to the thermal mass and conductivity of glass, minimized Joule heating effects, making the system highly efficient and fast. Such innovations highlight the potential of microfluidic devices in analytical chemistry, particularly in applications requiring quick and precise analyses.

== See also ==
- Advanced Simulation Library
- Droplet-based microfluidics
- Fluidics
- Induced-charge electrokinetics
- Integrated fluidic circuit
- Lab-on-a-chip
- Microfluidic cell culture
- Microfluidic modulation spectroscopy
- Microphysiometry
- Micropumps
- Microvalves
- uFluids@Home
- Paper-based microfluidics
