= Morris Tanenbaum =

American physical chemist and executive (1928–2023)

- Born: November 10, 1928; Huntington, West Virginia
- Died: February 26, 2023 (aged 94); New Providence, New Jersey
- Education: Princeton University (Ph.D.), Johns Hopkins University
- Known for: Semiconductor manufacturing
- Scientific career
- Workplaces: Bell Laboratories, AT&T Corporation

Morris Tanenbaum (November 10, 1928 – February 26, 2023) was an American physical chemist and executive who worked at Bell Laboratories and AT&T Corporation.

Tanenbaum made significant contributions in the fields of transistor development and semiconductor manufacturing. Although it was not made public at the time, he developed the first silicon transistor, demonstrating it on January 26, 1954, at Bell Labs. He also helped develop the first gas-diffused silicon transistor, which convinced Bell administrators to prefer the use of silicon rather than germanium in their transistor design. He later led a team that developed the first high-field superconducting magnets.

Later in his career he became an executive. He dealt with the separation of Bell Laboratories and AT&T, and became the first chief executive officer and chairman of the board at AT&T Corporation on January 1, 1984.

== Early life and education ==
Morris Tanenbaum was born to Ruben Simon Tanenbaum and Mollie Tanenbaum, on November 10, 1928, in Huntington, West Virginia, US. Tanenbaum's parents were Jewish, and had emigrated from Russia and Poland, first to Buenos Aires, Argentina and then to the United States. Ruben Tanenbaum owned a delicatessen.

Morris Tanenbaum attended Johns Hopkins University, earning his bachelor's degree in chemistry in 1949. As a sophomore at Johns Hopkins University, Tanenbaum became engaged to his future wife Charlotte Silver in September 1949, after his graduation from Johns Hopkins.

Encouraged by professor Clark Bricker, who was himself moving, Tanenbaum went from Johns Hopkins to Princeton University for his doctoral work. There he first studied spectroscopy with Bricker. He then did his thesis work with Walter Kauzmann, studying the properties of metal single crystals. Tanenbaum received his Ph.D. in chemistry from Princeton in 1952 after completing a doctoral dissertation titled "Studies of the plastic flow and annealing behavior of zinc crystals."

== Career ==
Morris Tanenbaum joined the chemistry department at Bell Telephone Laboratories in 1952. He held a number of positions at Bell, beginning in the technical staff from 1952 to 1956, becoming assistant director of the metallurgical department until 1962, then director of the solid-state development laboratory until 1964. He was executive vice-president for systems engineering and development from 1975 to 1976.

Tanenbaum then moved to the Western Electric Company, where he worked as director of research and development (1964–1968), vice president of the engineering division (1968–1972) and vice president of manufacturing: transmission equipment (1972–1975).

He returned to Bell Laboratories in 1975 as vice President of engineering and network services from 1976 to 1978. He served as president of the New Jersey Bell Telephone Company from 1978 to 1980, then returned to Bell Laboratories as Executive Vice President for Administration from 1980 to 1984. On January 16, 1985, he was appointed "corporate executive vice president responsible for financial management and strategic planning". Concerns that AT&T and Bell Laboratories effectively held a monopoly on communication technology throughout the United States and Canada led to an antitrust case, United States v. AT&T, and the eventual breakup of the Bell System. Tanenbaum was closely involved in discussion of related senate legislation, and helped to draft the proposed "Baxter I" amendment.

Following the restructuring, Tanenbaum became the first chief executive officer and chairman of the board at AT&T Corporation from 1984 to 1986. From 1986 to 1988 he served as AT&T's Vice Chairman for Finance, and from 1988 to 1991, AT&T's vice chairman for finance and chief financial officer.

== Research ==
When Tanenbaum joined the chemistry department at Bell Laboratories in 1952, Bell was a hotbed for semiconductor research. The first transistor had been created there in December 1947 by William Bradford Shockley, John Bardeen and Walter Houser Brattain. Their point-contact transistor, a block of the semiconductor germanium with two wires touching it, was announced at a press conference in New York City on June 30, 1948.

Finding better semiconductor materials to support the "transistor effect" was a critical area of research at Bell. Gordon Teal and technician Ernest Buehler did pioneering research on the growing and doping of semiconductor crystals between 1949 and 1952. Teal's group built the first grown-junction germanium transistors, which were announced by Shockley at a press conference on July 4, 1951. Meanwhile, Gerald Pearson did important early work investigating the properties of silicon.

Tanenbaum's initial work at Bell focused on possible single crystal Group III-V semiconductors such as indium antimonide (InSb) and gallium antimonide (GaSb).

=== The first silicon transistor ===
In 1953, Tanenbaum was asked by Shockley to see if transistors could be made using silicon, from group III-IV. Tanenbaum built on Pearson's research, and worked with technical assistant Ernest Buehler, whom he described as "a master craftsman in building apparatus and growing semiconductor crystals." They used samples of highly purified silicon from DuPont to grow crystals.

On January 26, 1954, Tanenbaum recorded a successful demonstration of the first silicon transistor in his logbook. However, Bell Laboratories did not publicise Tanenbaum's discovery—the successful transistor had been constructed using a rate-growing process, which was felt to be poorly suited to large-scale manufacturing. Diffusion processes, pioneered by Bell's Calvin Fuller, were seen as more promising. Tanenbaum became the team leader for a group studying the possible application of diffusion to the fabrication of silicon transistors.

In the meantime, Gordon Teal had moved to Texas Instruments, where he was essential to the organization of TI's research department. He also led its team of silicon transistor researchers. On April 14, 1954, he and Willis Adcock successfully tested and demonstrated the first grown-junction silicon transistor. Like Tanenbaum, they used highly purified DuPont silicon. Teal was able to bring the silicon transistor to production. He announced the results and displayed the TI transistors on May 10, 1954, at the Institute of Radio Engineers (IRE) National Conference on Airborne Electronics, in Dayton, Ohio.

=== The first gas-diffused silicon transistor ===
By 1954, several researchers at Bell Labs were experimenting with diffusion techniques to create layered semiconductors. Charles A. Lee developed a germanium semiconductor using diffused arsenic in late 1954. Meanwhile Tanenbaum worked with Calvin Fuller, D. E. Thomas, and others to develop a gas diffusion method for silicon semiconductors. Fuller developed a way to expose thin slices of crystalline silicon to gaseous aluminum and antimony, which diffused into the silicon to form thin multiple layers. Tanenbaum needed to establish a reliable electrical contact with the middle layer.

After weeks of experimenting, Tanenbaum wrote in his laboratory notebook on March 17, 1955, "This looks like the transistor we’ve been waiting for. It should be a cinch to make." The diffused-base silicon transistor was able to amplify signals at frequencies above 100 megahertz, with a switching speed 10 times faster than previous silicon transistors. The news convinced executive Jack Andrew Morton to return early from a trip to Europe and adopt silicon as the material for the company's future transistor and diode development.

In 1956, with financial backing from Arnold Beckman, William Shockley left Bell Labs to form Shockley Semiconductor. Shockley made Tanenbaum an offer but Tanenbaum chose to stay with Bell Labs. The n-p-n silicon transistors created with the double-diffusion method were referred to as "mesa transistors" as they had a raised area or "mesa" above the surrounding layers of etching. The initial goal at Shockley Semiconductor was to fabricate prototype n-p-n silicon transistors, based on the "mesa" structure pioneered by Tanenbaum and his co-workers at Bell Labs. By May 1958 Shockley's employees had successfully met that goal.

Bell Laboratories did not take advantage of Tanenbaum's early achievements by capitalizing on the possibilities of chip technology. They became increasingly dependent on other companies for microchips and large-scale integrated circuits. Tanenbaum expressed disappointment at this missed opportunity.

=== High-field superconducting magnets ===
After becoming Assistant Director of the Metallurgical Department at Bell Labs in 1962, Tanenbaum led a group doing basic research into applied metallurgy. John Eugene Kunzler was interested in the electrical properties of commercially important metals at low temperatures. Rudy Kompfner was trying to build maser amplifiers to detect and measure very low microwave signals, and needed high magnetic fields to tune his masers. Kunzler tried developing superconducting coils to meet Kompfner's needs, using lead-bismuth alloys drawn into wire and insulated with copper. He was able to produce record-setting magnetic fields of one or two thousand gauss, but they were not high enough for Kompfner's use. Berndt Matthias had discovered that a brittle ceramic-like material, Nb3Sn, compounded of niobium and tin, could superconduct at a higher temperature than previous superconductors.

Tanenbaum worked with technician Ernest Buehler to develop a way to form the Nb3Sn compound into a coil and insulate it. He credits Buehler with the idea behind their PIT (powder in tube) approach. They sought to avoid Nb3Sn's fragility issues by delaying the point at which the material was formed: 1) combining a mixture of ductile, pure niobium metal and tin metal powders in the proper ratio, 2) using it to fill a tube formed from a non-superconducting metal such as copper, silver or stainless steel, 3) drawing the composite tube into a fine wire which could then be coiled and 4) finally heating the already-coiled tube to a temperature at which the niobium and tin powders would react chemically to form Nb3Sn.

On December 15, 1960, their first day of testing, Tanenbaum and Kunzler's group tested the high field properties of a rod of Nb3Sn that had been fired at 2400°C. It was still superconducting at 8.8 T, their maximum available field strength. Tanenbaum had wagered Kunzler a bottle of Scotch whiskey for every .3T reached above 2.5T, so this outcome represented an unexpected 21 bottles of Scotch. Testing PIT strands resulted in even more powerful effects.

Tanenbaum and Kunzler's group created the first high-field superconducting magnets, showing that Nb3Sn exhibits superconductivity at large currents and strong magnetic fields. Nb3Sn became the first known material suitable for use in high-powered magnets and electric machinery. Their discovery made possible the eventual development of medical imaging devices.

Tanenbaum eventually moved from research into management, a change in focus that some speculate may have cost him a Nobel Prize.

== Death ==
Tanenbaum died in his home in New Providence, New Jersey, on February 26, 2023.

== Awards and honors ==
In 1962, Tanenbaum became a Fellow of the American Physical Society.

In 1970, he became a fellow of the Institute of Electrical and Electronics Engineers (IEEE). In 1972, Tanenbaum was elected a member of the National Academy of Engineering, for "Achievements in solid state research and technology and in technology transfer from research to manufacturing." In 1984 he received the IEEE Centennial Medal.

In 1990 Tanenbaum became a member of the American Academy of Arts and Sciences (AAAS). In 1996 he became a life member of the MIT Corporation, the board of trustees of Massachusetts Institute of Technology. He received multiple honorary doctorates.

In 2013, Tanenbaum received a lifetime achievement award, the Science and Technology Medal, at the 34th Edison Patent Awards which are given by the Research & Development Council of New Jersey.
