= Tetrode (disambiguation) =

Tetrode can refer to:

- Tetrode, an electronic device with four active electrodes, such as a vacuum tube
  - Beam tetrode
  - Field-effect tetrode, a solid-state device
- Tetrode (biology), an electrode used in biology to sample neural signals
- Tetrode transistor, a transistor with four active terminals
- Sackur–Tetrode equation, an expression for the entropy of a monatomic classical ideal gas
- Hugo Tetrode, a Dutch physicist (1895–1931)
- Willem Danielsz van Tetrode, a Dutch sculptor (ca. 1530 – ca. 1587)
