= Spacistor =

The spacistor was a type of transistor developed in the 1950s as an improvement over the point-contact transistor and the later alloy-junction transistor. It offered much higher speed than earlier transistors. It became obsolete in the early 1960s with the development of the diffusion transistor.

It is composed of a P–N junction with a wide depletion region, inside which two additional contacts are made: the injector and the modulator. The P material was called the base and the N material was called the collector. The injector acted like a BJT (bipolar junction transistor) emitter, the modulator like a base, and the collector like its BJT namesake. It achieved high speed by reducing the charge carrier's transit time.
