= MADT =

MADT may refer to:

- Micro alloy diffused transistor, in electronics
- Multiple APIC Description Table, in computing
