= Tetrode (biology) =

Type of electrode

A tetrode is a type of electrode used in neuroscience for electrophysiological recordings. They are generally used to record the extracellular field potentials from nervous tissue, e.g. the brain. Tetrodes are constructed by bundling together four very small electrodes; each wire is generally less than 30 μm in diameter. Tetrodes are used to classify extra-cellular action potentials into sets generated by the individual neurons, as each channel of the tetrode is usually close enough to a cell such that action potentials emitted by that cell are detected on each of the four channels, but because of the spatial distribution of the individual channels, the amplitude of the signal varies across the four channels.

== Clustering ==
Clustering techniques involve both examining the waveform of individual spikes, and examining the spike height across all four channels. Using this method, single neurons in the neocortex can be isolated and analyzed.

== Principal component analysis ==
This technique involves examining the spikes at reduced dimensionality to find its similarity with other spikes.

== See also ==
- Tetrode
- Tetrode transistor
