= Tetrode transistor =

Transistor with four active terminals

A tetrode transistor is any transistor having four active terminals.

== Early tetrode transistors ==
There were two types of tetrode transistor developed in the early 1950s as an improvement over the point-contact transistor and the later grown-junction transistor and alloy-junction transistor. Both offered much higher speed than earlier transistors.

- Point-contact transistor having two emitters. It became obsolete in the mid-1950s.
- Modified grown-junction transistor or alloy-junction transistor having two connections at opposite ends of the base. It achieved its high speed by reducing the input to output capacitance and base resistance. It became obsolete in the early 1960s with the development of the diffusion transistor.

== Modern tetrode transistors ==
- Dual-emitter transistor, used in two (or more) input transistor–transistor logic gates.
- Dual-collector transistor, used in two-output integrated injection logic gates.
- Diffused planar silicon bipolar junction transistor, used in some integrated circuits. This transistor, apart from the three electrodes (emitter, base, and collector), has a fourth electrode or grid made of conducting material placed near the emitter-base junction from which it is insulated by a silica layer.
- Field-effect tetrode

== See also ==
- Multigate transistor
- Pentode transistor
