= Fujio Masuoka =

Japanese engineer (born 1943)

Fujio Masuoka (舛岡 富士雄)
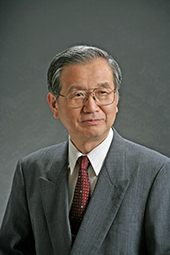
- Born: May 8, 1943 (age 83); Takasaki, Gunma
- Education: Tohoku University
- Known for: Flash memory NOR flash NAND flash GAAFET
- Awards: IEEE Morris N. Liebmann Memorial Award
- Scientific career
- Fields: Electrical engineering
- Workplaces: Toshiba; Tohoku University; Unisantis
- Doctoral advisor: Jun-ichi Nishizawa

Fujio Masuoka (舛岡 富士雄, Masuoka Fujio; born May 8, 1943) is a Japanese engineer, who has worked for Toshiba and Tohoku University, and is currently chief technical officer (CTO) of Unisantis Electronics. He is best known as the inventor of flash memory, including the development of both the NOR flash and NAND flash types in the 1980s. He also invented the first gate-all-around (GAA) MOSFET (GAAFET) transistor, an early non-planar 3D transistor, in 1988.

== Biography ==
Masuoka attended Tohoku University in Sendai, Japan, where he earned an undergraduate degree in engineering in 1966 and doctorate in 1971. He joined Toshiba in 1971. There, he invented stacked-gate avalanche-injection metal–oxide–semiconductor (SAMOS) memory, a precursor to electrically erasable programmable read-only memory (EEPROM) and flash memory. In 1976, he developed dynamic random-access memory (DRAM) with a double poly-Si structure. In 1977 he moved to Toshiba Semiconductor Business Division, where he developed 1 Mb DRAM.

Masuoka was excited mostly by the idea of non-volatile memory, memory that would last even when power was turned off. The EEPROM of the time took very long to erase. He developed the "floating gate" technology that could be erased much faster. He filed a patent in 1980 along with Hisakazu Iizuka. His colleague Shoji Ariizumi suggested the word "flash" because the erasure process reminded him of the flash of a camera. The results (with capacity of only 8192 bytes) were published in 1984, and became the basis for flash memory technology of much larger capacities.

Masuoka and colleagues presented the invention of NOR flash in 1984, and then NAND flash at the IEEE 1987 International Electron Devices Meeting (IEDM) held in San Francisco. Toshiba commercially launched NAND flash memory in 1987. Toshiba gave Masuoka a few hundred dollar bonus for the invention, and later tried to demote him. But it was the American company Intel which made billions of dollars in sales on related technology. In 2002, Toshiba's press department told Forbes that it was Intel that invented flash memory.

In 1988, a Toshiba research team led by Masuoka demonstrated the first gate-all-around (GAA) MOSFET (GAAFET) transistor. It was an early non-planar 3D transistor, and they called it a "surrounding gate transistor" (SGT). He became a professor at Tohoku University in 1994.

Masuoka received the 1997 IEEE Morris N. Liebmann Memorial Award of the Institute of Electrical and Electronics Engineers. In 2004, Masuoka became the chief technical officer of Unisantis Electronics aiming to develop a three-dimensional transistor, based on his earlier surrounding-gate transistor (SGT) invention from 1988. In 2006, he settled a lawsuit with Toshiba for ¥87m (about US$758,000).

He has a total of 270 registered patents and 71 additional pending patents. He has been suggested as a potential candidate for the Nobel Prize in Physics, along with Robert H. Dennard who invented single-transistor DRAM.

== Recognition ==
- 1997 - IEEE Morris N. Liebmann Memorial Award
- 2007 - Medal with Purple Ribbon
- 2013 - Person of Cultural Merit
- 2016 - Order of the Sacred Treasure, Gold and Silver Star
- 2018 - Honda Prize
