= Herbert Kroemer =

German–American physicist (1928–2024)

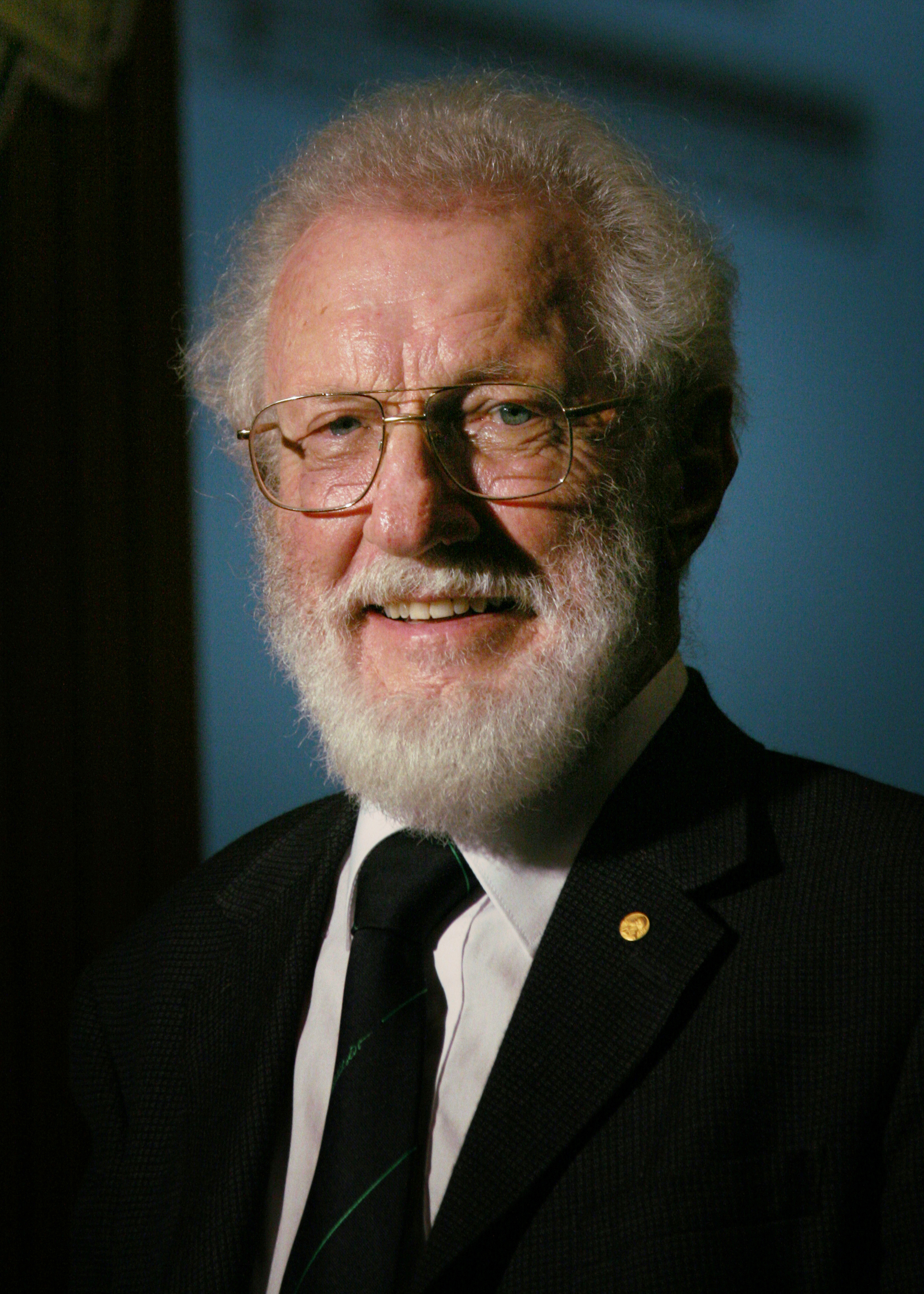
- Kroemer in 2008
- Born: August 25, 1928; Weimar, Germany
- Died: March 8, 2024 (aged 95); Santa Barbara, California, U.S.
- Citizenship: Germany; United States (nat. 2003)
- Education: University of Jena University of Göttingen: Diplom, Physics; Dr. rer. nat., Theoretical Physics
- Known for: Drift-field transistor; Heterojunction bipolar transistor; Quantum well laser
- Awards: J. J. Ebers Award (1973); IEEE Jack A. Morton Award (1986); Nobel Prize in Physics (2000); IEEE Medal of Honor (2002)
- Scientific career
- Fields: Physics
- Workplaces: Deutsche Bundespost; Radio Corporation of America; Varian Associates; Fairchild Semiconductor; University of Colorado Boulder; University of California, Santa Barbara
- Thesis: Zur Theorie des Germaniumgleichrichters und des Transistors : Ausz. Mit 10 Fig. im Text (1953)
- Doctoral advisor: Richard Becker

Herbert Kroemer (German: [ˈhɛʁbɛʁt ˈkʁøːmɐ]; August 25, 1928 – March 8, 2024) was a German–American theoretical physicist who shared one half of the 2000 Nobel Prize in Physics with Zhores Alferov "for developing semiconductor heterostructures used in high-speed- and opto-electronics." His research into transistors was a stepping stone to the later development of mobile phone technologies.

== Biography ==
=== Education ===
Herbert Kroemer was born on August 25, 1928, in Weimar, State of Thuringia, Germany. His father was a civil servant, while his mother was a housewife; neither of them had a high school education. After graduating from Gymnasium in 1947, Kroemer entered the University of Jena, where he studied physics under Friedrich Hund. By early 1948, the political suppression in Soviet-occupied Germany became very severe; he recalls that every week, some of his fellow students had suddenly disappeared. In the summer of 1948, Kroemer worked for Siemens in Berlin. During the Berlin Blockade, he was airlifted out of Berlin and moved to West Germany to continue his education.

Having been initially rejected, Kroemer was accepted as a student by the University of Göttingen, where he was supervised by Fritz Sauter for a Diplom. His Diplom thesis was an extension of William Shockley's 1939 paper on the nature of surface states in one-dimensional potentials. In 1952, he received a doctorate in Theoretical Physics for a thesis on hot-electron effects in the then-new transistor.

=== Career ===
Unable to find work at a university as a new graduate, Kroemer became a "house theorist" at the Central Telecommunications Laboratory of the Deutsche Bundespost. In 1954, he immigrated to the United States, where he worked for the Radio Corporation of America (1954–1957), Varian Associates (1959–1966), and Fairchild Semiconductor (1966–1968).

In 1968, Kroemer was appointed Professor of Electrical Engineering at the University of Colorado Boulder. In 1976, he joined the Department of Electrical and Computer Engineering at the University of California, Santa Barbara (UCSB), focusing its semiconductor research program on the emerging compound semiconductor technology rather than on mainstream silicon technology. He held the Donald W. Whittier Chair of Electrical Engineering at UCSB until his retirement as professor emeritus in 2012.

== Research ==
Kroemer always preferred to work on problems that are ahead of mainstream technology, being the first to point out in the mid-1950s that advantages could be gained in various semiconductor devices by incorporating heterojunctions. Most notably, in 1963, he proposed the concept of the double-heterostructure laser, which is now a central concept in the field of semiconductor lasers. Kroemer became an early pioneer in molecular-beam epitaxy, concentrating on applying the technology to untried new materials.

Charles Kittel had published the successful Thermal Physics in 1969, and enlisted Kroemer to edit it for a second edition, which appeared in 1980. Kroemer is also the author of the textbook Quantum Mechanics for Engineering, Materials Science and Applied Physics.

== Personal life ==
Kroemer was an atheist. He became a naturalized U.S. citizen in 2003.

Kroemer died on March 8, 2024, in Santa Barbara, California, at the age of 95.

== Recognition ==
=== Memberships ===
| Year | Organization | Type | Ref. |
|---|---|---|---|
| 1970 | Institute of Electrical and Electronics Engineers | Life Fellow | |
| 1997 | National Academy of Engineering | Emeritus | |
| 2003 | National Academy of Sciences | Emeritus | |

=== Awards ===
| Year | Organization | Award | Co-recipients | Citation | Ref. |
|---|---|---|---|---|---|
| 1973 | IEEE Electron Devices Society | J. J. Ebers Award | — | "For outstanding technical contribution to electron devices." | |
| 1986 | Institute of Electrical and Electronics Engineers | IEEE Jack A. Morton Award | — | "For pioneering the theory and device applications of semiconductor heterostructures." | |
| 2000 | Royal Swedish Academy of Sciences | Nobel Prize in Physics | Zhores Alferov and Jack Kilby | "For developing semiconductor heterostructures used in high-speed- and opto-electronics." | |
| 2002 | Institute of Electrical and Electronics Engineers | IEEE Medal of Honor | — | "For contributions to high-frequency transistors and hot-electron devices, especially heterostructure devices from heterostructure bipolar transistors to lasers, and their molecular beam epitaxy technology." | |

=== Honors ===
| Year | Country | Honor | Ref. |
|---|---|---|---|
| 2001 | Germany | Grand Cross of the Order of Merit of the Federal Republic of Germany | |

== See also ==
- List of Nobel laureates affiliated with the University of California, Santa Barbara
