= Drift-field transistor =

The drift-field transistor, also called the drift transistor or graded base transistor, is a type of high-speed bipolar junction transistor having a doping-engineered electric field in the base to reduce the charge carrier base transit time.

Invented by Herbert Kroemer at the Central Bureau of Telecommunications Technology of the German Postal Service, in 1953, it continues to influence the design of modern high-speed bipolar junction transistors.

Early drift transistors were made by diffusing the base dopant in a way that caused a higher doping concentration near the emitter reducing towards the collector.

This graded base happens automatically with the double diffused planar transistor (so they aren't usually called drift transistors).

== Similar high speed transistors ==
Another way to speed the base transit time of this type of transistor is to vary the band gap across the base, e.g. in the SiGe [epitaxial base] BJT the base of Si_{1−η}Ge_{η} can be grown with η approx 0.2 by the collector and reducing to 0 near the emitter (keeping the dopant concentration constant).

== Applications ==
Germanium diffused junction transistors were used by IBM in their Saturated Drift Transistor Resistor Logic (SDTRL), used in the IBM 1620. (Announced Oct 1959)
