= Low-level injection =

Phenomenon

Low-level injection conditions for a p–n junction, in physics and electronics, refers to the state where the number of minority carriers generated is small compared to the majority carriers of the material. The semiconductor's majority-carrier concentration will remain (relatively) unchanged, while the minority-carrier concentration sees a large increase. In this condition minority-carrier recombination rates are linear.

The following equation must be satisfied for a semiconductor under carrier injection conditions:

$$n = \Delta n + n_0,$$

where $n$ is the number of electrons, $\Delta n$ is the excess carriers injected into the semiconductor, and $n_0$ is the equilibrium concentration of electrons in the semiconductor

The following relation must also be true, because for every electron injected a hole must also be created to keep a balance of charge:

$$\Delta n = \Delta p.$$

The assumption of low-level injection can be made regarding an n-type semiconductor, which affects the equations in the following way:

$$\Delta n \ll N_D.$$

Therefore $n = N_D$ and $p = \Delta p + p_0$.

In comparison, a semiconductor in high injection means that the number of generated carriers is large compared to the background doping density of the material. In this condition minority carrier recombination rates are proportional to the number of carriers squared.
