= Pentode transistor =

Transistor with 5 active terminals

Diagram of pentode transistor as described by Lawrence E. Dickens in their patent, with a cross section view and alternative design with interposed layer of SiO₂. Gates are marked G₁, G₂ and G₃.

A pentode transistor is any transistor having five active terminals.

== Early pentode transistors ==
One early pentode transistor was developed in the early 1950s as an improvement over the point-contact transistor.

- A point-contact transistor having three emitters. It became obsolete in the middle 1950s.

Pentode field-effect transistors having 3 gates, similar to vacuum tube pentodes have also been described

== Modern pentode transistors ==
- Triple emitter transistor in three input transistor-transistor logic gates.
- Triple collector transistor in three output integrated injection logic gates.
- Field effect transistor having three gates.
