= Transistor =

Solid-state electrically operated switch also used as an amplifier

Bipolar junction transistor (BJT)
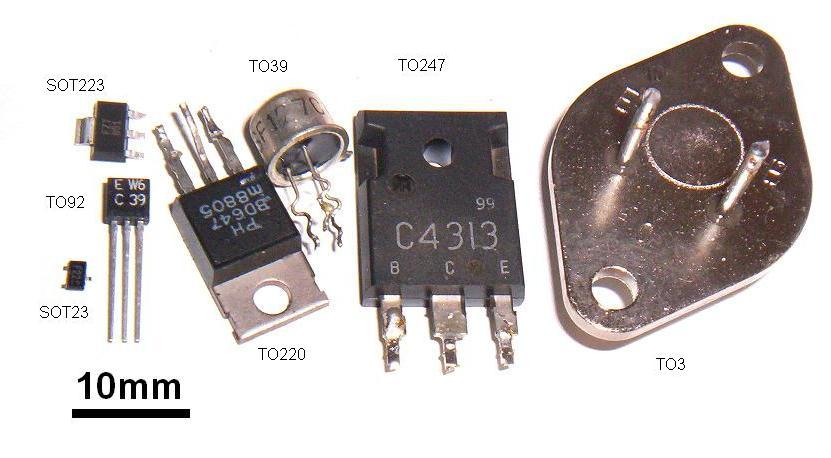
- Component type: Active
- Inventor: John Bardeen; Walter Brattain; William Shockley
- Invention year: 1947
- First produced: 1950s
- Pin names: Base, collector, and emitter

Electronic symbol
- NPN (left) and PNP (right) bipolar junction transistor symbols

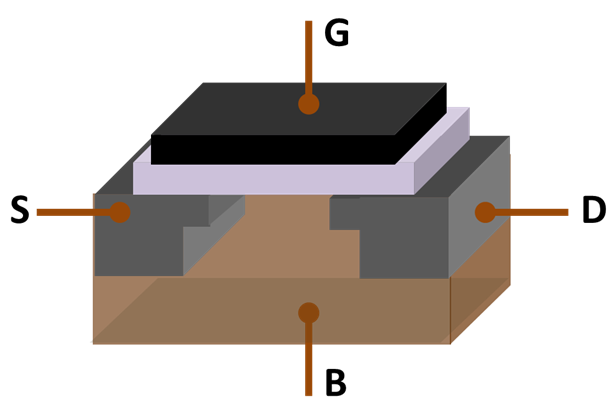
Metal–oxide–semiconductor field-effect transistor (MOSFET), showing gate (G), body (B), source (S) and drain (D) terminals. The gate is separated from the body by an insulating layer (white).

A transistor is a semiconductor device used to amplify or switch electrical signals and power. It is one of the fundamental building blocks of modern electronics. A transistor is composed of semiconductor material, often with at least three terminals for connection to an electronic circuit. A voltage or current applied to one pair of the transistor's terminals controls the current through another pair of terminals. Because the controlled (output) power can be higher than the controlling (input) power, a transistor can be used to amplify a signal. Some transistors are packaged individually, but many more in miniature form are found embedded in integrated circuits. Because transistors are the key active components in practically all modern electronics, they are considered one of the 20th century's greatest inventions.

Physicist Julius Edgar Lilienfeld proposed the concept of a field-effect transistor (FET) in 1925, but it was not possible to construct a working device at that time. The first working device was a point-contact transistor invented in 1947 by physicists John Bardeen, Walter Brattain, and William Shockley at Bell Labs who shared the 1956 Nobel Prize in Physics for their achievement. The most widely used type of transistor, the metal–oxide–semiconductor field-effect transistor (MOSFET), was invented at Bell Labs between 1955 and 1960. Transistors revolutionized the field of electronics and paved the way for smaller and cheaper radios, calculators, computers, and other electronic devices.

Most transistors are made from very pure silicon, and some from germanium, but certain other semiconductor materials are sometimes used. A transistor may have only one kind of charge carrier in a field-effect transistor, or may have two kinds of charge carriers in bipolar junction transistor devices. Compared with the vacuum tube, transistors are generally smaller and require less power to operate. Certain vacuum tubes have advantages over transistors at very high operating frequencies or high operating voltages, such as traveling-wave tubes and gyrotrons. Many types of transistors are made to standardized specifications by multiple manufacturers.

== History ==
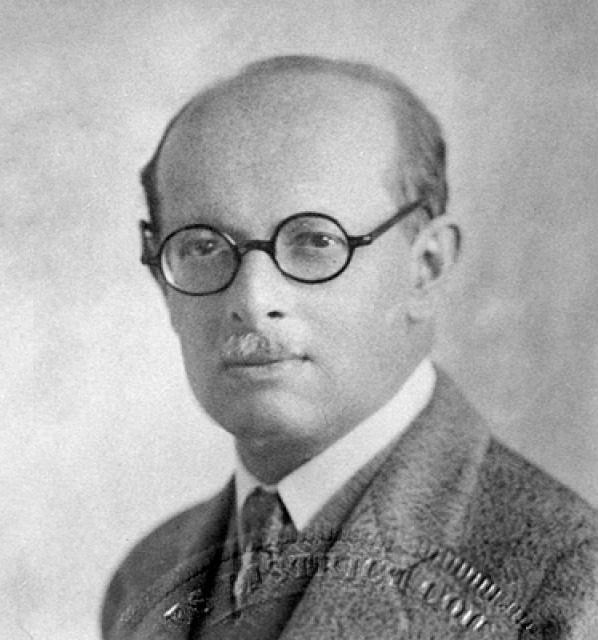
Julius Edgar Lilienfeld proposed the concept of a field-effect transistor in 1925.

The thermionic triode, a vacuum tube invented in 1907, enabled amplified radio technology and long-distance telephony. The triode, however, was a fragile device that consumed a substantial amount of power. In 1909, physicist William Eccles discovered the crystal diode oscillator. Physicist Julius Edgar Lilienfeld filed a patent for a field-effect transistor (FET) in Canada in 1925, intended as a solid-state replacement for the triode. He filed identical patents in the United States in 1926 and 1928. However, he did not publish any research articles about his devices nor did his patents cite any specific examples of a working prototype. Because the production of high-quality semiconductor materials was still decades away, Lilienfeld's solid-state amplifier ideas would not have found practical use in the 1920s and 1930s, even if such a device had been built. In 1934, inventor Oskar Heil patented a similar device in Europe.

=== Bipolar transistors ===
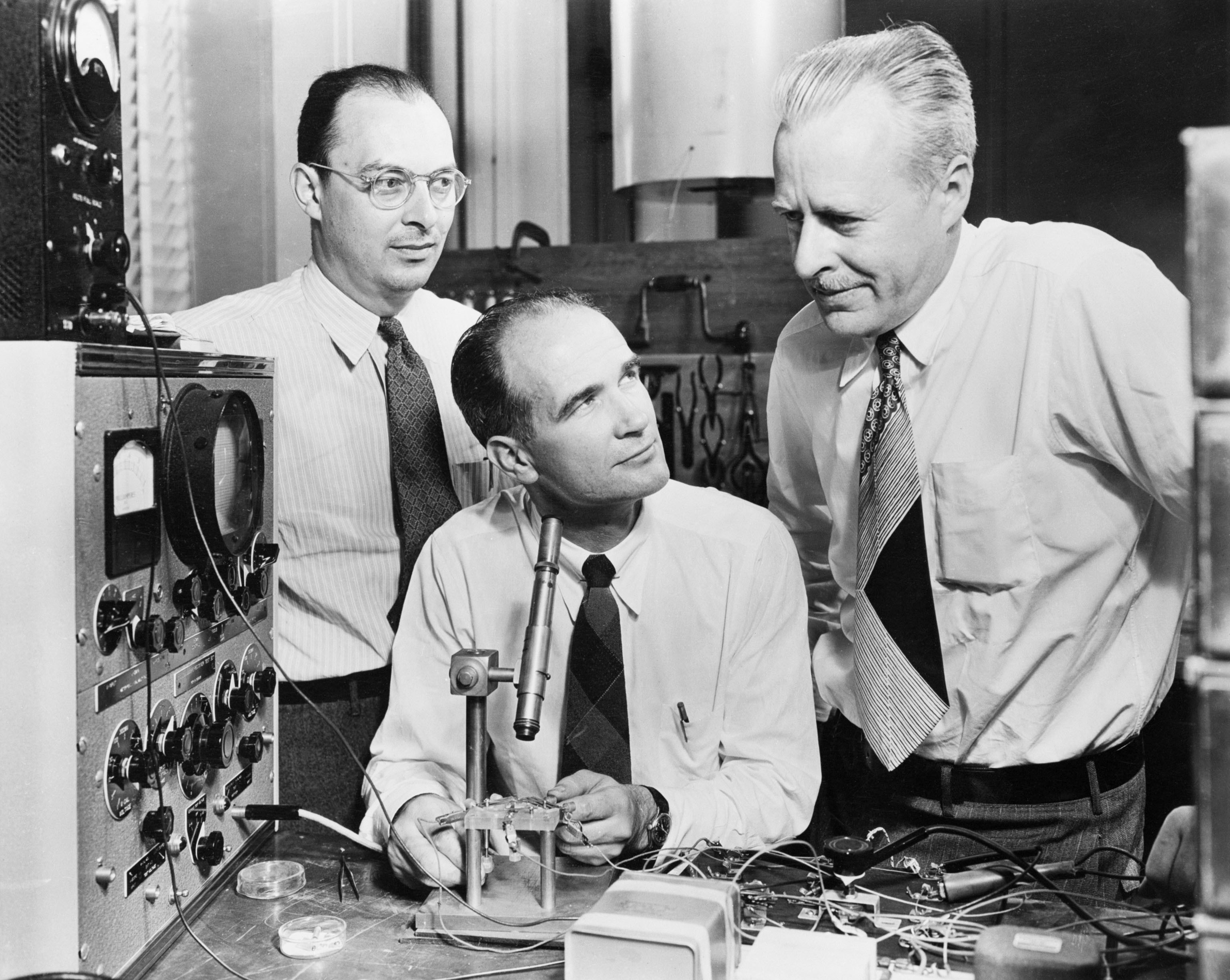
John Bardeen, William Shockley, and Walter Brattain at Bell Labs in 1948; Bardeen and Brattain invented the point-contact transistor in 1947 and Shockley invented the bipolar junction transistor in 1948.

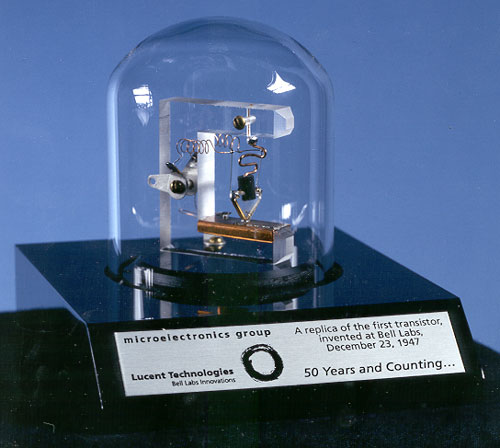
A replica of the first working transistor, a point-contact transistor invented in 1947

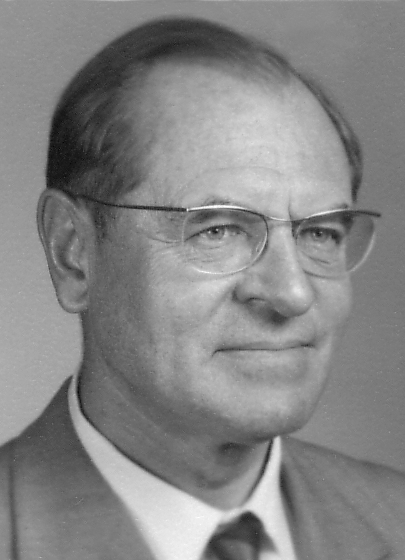
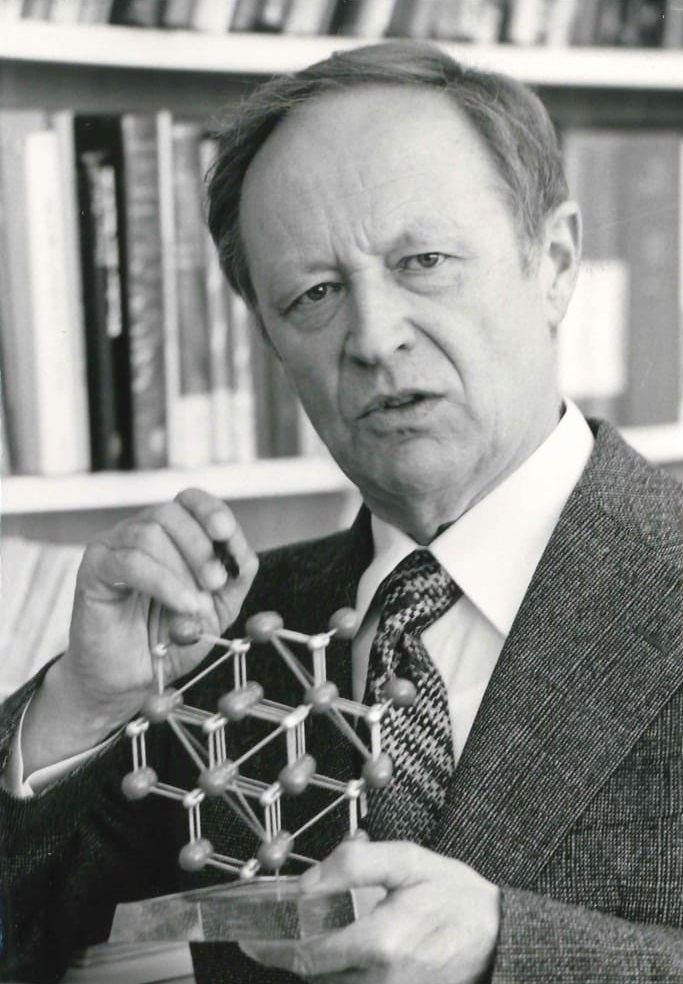
Herbert Mataré and Heinrich Welker independently invented a point-contact transistor in June 1948.

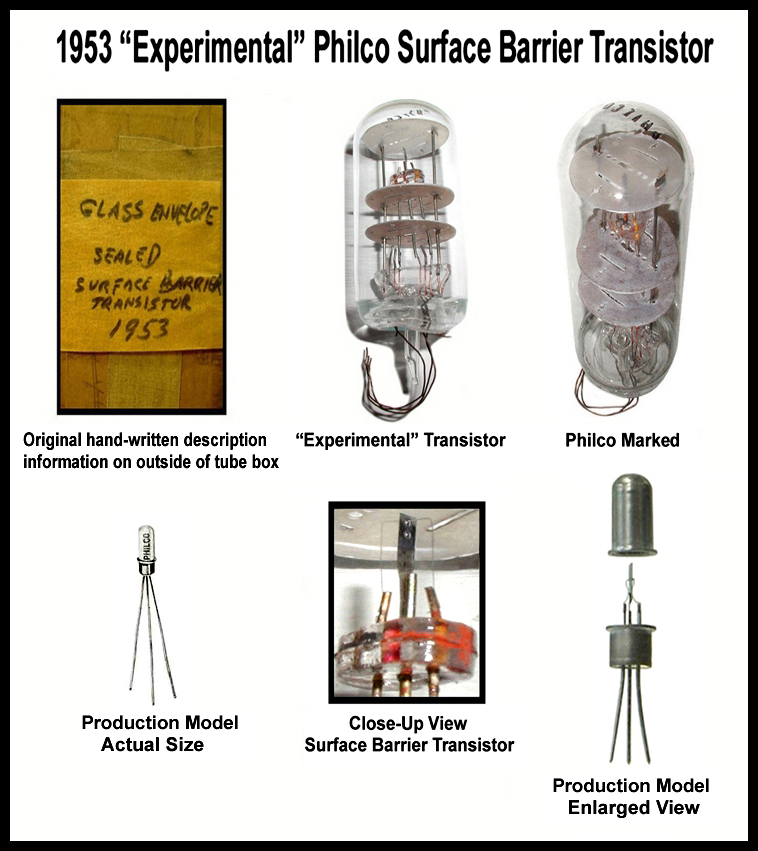
A Philco surface-barrier transistor developed and produced in 1953

From November 17 to December 23, 1947, John Bardeen and Walter Brattain at AT&T's Bell Labs in Murray Hill, New Jersey, performed experiments and observed that when two gold point contacts were applied to a crystal of germanium, a signal was produced with the output power greater than the input. Solid State Physics Group leader William Shockley saw the potential in this, and over the next few months worked to greatly expand the knowledge of semiconductors. The term transistor was coined by John R. Pierce as a contraction of the term transresistance. According to Lillian Hoddeson and Vicki Daitch, Shockley proposed that Bell Labs' first patent for a transistor should be based on the field-effect and that he be named as the inventor. Having unearthed Lilienfeld's patents that went into obscurity years earlier, lawyers at Bell Labs advised against Shockley's proposal because the idea of a field-effect transistor that used an electric field as a grid was not new. Instead, what Bardeen, Brattain, and Shockley invented in 1947 was the first point-contact transistor. To acknowledge this accomplishment, Shockley, Bardeen and Brattain jointly received the 1956 Nobel Prize in Physics "for their researches on semiconductors and their discovery of the transistor effect".

Shockley's team initially attempted to build a field-effect transistor (FET) by trying to modulate the conductivity of a semiconductor, but was unsuccessful, mainly due to problems with the surface states, the dangling bond, and the germanium and copper compound materials. Trying to understand the mysterious reasons behind this failure led them instead to invent the bipolar point-contact and junction transistors.

In 1948, the point-contact transistor was independently invented by physicists Herbert Mataré and Heinrich Welker while working at the Compagnie des Freins et Signaux Westinghouse, a Westinghouse subsidiary in Paris. Mataré had previous experience in developing crystal detectors from silicon and germanium in the German radar effort during World War II. With this knowledge, he began researching the phenomenon of interference in 1947. By June 1948, witnessing currents flowing through point-contacts, he produced consistent results using samples of germanium produced by Welker, similar to what Bardeen and Brattain had accomplished earlier in December 1947. Realizing that Bell Labs' scientists had already invented the transistor, the company rushed to get its transistron into production for amplified use in France's telephone network, filing his first transistor patent application on August 13, 1948.

The first bipolar junction transistors were invented by Bell Labs' William Shockley, who applied for patent (2,569,347) on June 26, 1948. On April 12, 1950, Bell Labs chemists Gordon Teal and Morgan Sparks successfully produced a working bipolar NPN junction amplifying germanium transistor. Bell announced the discovery of this new sandwich transistor in a press release on July 4, 1951.

The first high-frequency transistor was the surface-barrier germanium transistor developed by Philco in 1953, capable of operating at frequencies up to 60 MHz. They were made by etching depressions into an n-type germanium base from both sides with jets of indium(III) sulfate until it was a few ten-thousandths of an inch thick. Indium electroplated into the depressions formed the collector and emitter.

AT&T first used transistors in telecommunications equipment in the No. 4A Toll Crossbar Switching System in 1953, for selecting trunk circuits from routing information encoded on translator cards. Its predecessor, the Western Electric No. 3A phototransistor, read the mechanical encoding from punched metal cards.

The first prototype pocket transistor radio was shown by INTERMETALL, a company founded by Herbert Mataré in 1952, at the Internationale Funkausstellung Düsseldorf from August 29 to September 6, 1953. The first production-model pocket transistor radio was the Regency TR-1, released in October 1954. Produced as a joint venture between the Regency Division of Industrial Development Engineering Associates, I.D.E.A. and Texas Instruments of Dallas, Texas, the TR-1 was manufactured in Indianapolis, Indiana. It was a near pocket-sized radio with four transistors and one germanium diode. The industrial design was outsourced to the Chicago firm of Painter, Teague and Petertil. It was initially released in one of six colours: black, ivory, mandarin red, cloud grey, mahogany and olive green. Other colours shortly followed.

The first production all-transistor car radio was developed by Chrysler and Philco corporations and was announced in the April 28, 1955, edition of The Wall Street Journal. Chrysler made the Mopar model 914HR available as an option starting in fall 1955 for its new line of 1956 Chrysler and Imperial cars, which reached dealership showrooms on October 21, 1955.

The Sony TR-63, released in 1957, was the first mass-produced transistor radio, leading to the widespread adoption of transistor radios. Seven million TR-63s were sold worldwide by the mid-1960s. Sony's success with transistor radios led to transistors replacing vacuum tubes as the dominant electronic technology in the late 1950s.

The first working silicon transistor was developed at Bell Labs on January 26, 1954, by Morris Tanenbaum. The first production commercial silicon transistor was announced by Texas Instruments in May 1954. This was the work of Gordon Teal, an expert in growing crystals of high purity, who had previously worked at Bell Labs.

=== Field-effect transistors ===
The basic principle of the field-effect transistor (FET) was first proposed by physicist Julius Edgar Lilienfeld when he filed a patent for a device similar to MESFET in 1926, and for an insulated-gate field-effect transistor in 1928. The FET concept was later also theorized by engineer Oskar Heil in the 1930s and by William Shockley in the 1940s.

In 1945, JFET was patented by Heinrich Welker. Following Shockley's theoretical treatment on JFET in 1952, a working practical JFET was made in 1953 by George C. Dacey and Ian M. Ross.

In 1948, Bardeen and Brattain patented the progenitor of MOSFET at Bell Labs, an insulated-gate FET (IGFET) with an inversion layer. Bardeen's patent, and the concept of an inversion layer, forms the basis of CMOS and DRAM technology today.

In the early years of the semiconductor industry, companies focused on the junction transistor, a relatively bulky device that was difficult to mass-produce, limiting it to several specialized applications. Field-effect transistors (FETs) were theorized as potential alternatives, but researchers could not get them to work properly, largely due to the surface state barrier that prevented the external electric field from penetrating the material.

=== MOSFET (MOS transistor) ===
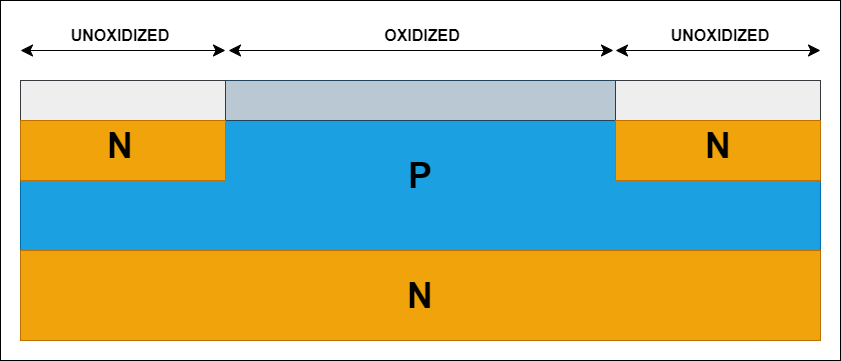
Diagram of one of the SiO_{2} transistor devices made by Frosch and Derrick

In 1955, Carl Frosch and Lincoln Derick accidentally grew a layer of silicon dioxide over the silicon wafer, for which they observed surface passivation effects. By 1957 Frosch and Derick, using masking and predeposition, were able to manufacture silicon dioxide field-effect transistors; the first planar transistors, in which drain and source were adjacent at the same surface. They showed that silicon dioxide insulated and protected silicon wafers and prevented dopants from diffusing into the wafer. After this, J. R. Ligenza and W. G. Spitzer studied the mechanism of thermally grown oxides, fabricated a high-quality Si/SiO_{2} stack and published their results in 1960.

Following this research, Mohamed Atalla and Dawon Kahng proposed a silicon MOS transistor in 1959 and successfully demonstrated a working MOS device with their Bell Labs team in 1960. Their team included E. E. LaBate and E. I. Povilonis, who fabricated the device; M. O. Thurston, L. A. D'Asaro, and J. R. Ligenza, who developed the diffusion processes, and H. K. Gummel and R. Lindner, who characterized the device. With its high scalability, much lower power consumption, and higher density than bipolar junction transistors, the MOSFET made it possible to build high-density integrated circuits, allowing the integration of more than 10,000 transistors in a single IC.

Bardeen and Brattain's 1948 inversion-layer concept forms the basis of CMOS technology today. The CMOS (complementary MOS) was invented by Chih-Tang Sah and Frank Wanlass at Fairchild Semiconductor in 1963. The first report of a floating-gate MOSFET was made by Dawon Kahng and Simon Sze in 1967.

In 1967, Bell Labs researchers Robert Kerwin, Donald Klein and John Sarace developed the self-aligned gate (silicon-gate) MOS transistor, which Fairchild Semiconductor researchers Federico Faggin and Tom Klein used to develop the first silicon-gate MOS integrated circuit.

A double-gate MOSFET was first demonstrated in 1984 by Electrotechnical Laboratory researchers Toshihiro Sekigawa and Yutaka Hayashi. The FinFET (fin field-effect transistor), a type of 3D non-planar multi-gate MOSFET, originated from the research of Digh Hisamoto and his team at Hitachi Central Research Laboratory in 1989.

== Importance ==
Because transistors are the key active components in practically all modern electronics, many people consider them one of the 20th century's greatest inventions.

The 1947 invention of the first transistor at Bell Labs was named an IEEE Milestone in 2009. Other Milestones include the inventions of the junction transistor in 1948 and the MOSFET in 1959.

The MOSFET is by far the most widely used transistor, in applications ranging from computers and electronics to communications technology such as smartphones. It has been considered the most important transistor, possibly the most important invention in electronics, and the device that enabled modern electronics. It has been the basis of modern digital electronics since the late 20th century, paving the way for the digital age. The US Patent and Trademark Office calls it a "groundbreaking invention that transformed life and culture around the world". Its ability to be mass-produced by a highly automated process (semiconductor device fabrication), from relatively basic materials, allows astonishingly low per-transistor costs. MOSFETs are the most numerously produced artificial objects in history, with more than 13 sextillion manufactured by 2018.

Although several companies each produce over a billion individually packaged (known as discrete) MOS transistors every year, the vast majority are produced in integrated circuits (also known as ICs, microchips, or simply chips), along with diodes, resistors, capacitors and other electronic components, to produce complete electronic circuits. A logic gate consists of up to about 20 transistors, whereas an advanced microprocessor, as of 2023, may contain as many as 92 billion transistors on a die, and double that 184 billion when dual die (and for exceptional chips, 2.6 trillion transistors, as of 2020). Transistors are often organized into logic gates in microprocessors to perform computation.

The transistor's low cost, flexibility and reliability have made it ubiquitous. Transistorized mechatronic circuits have replaced electromechanical devices in controlling appliances and machinery. It is often easier and cheaper to use a standard microcontroller and write a computer program to carry out a control function than to design an equivalent mechanical system.

== Simplified operation ==
A simple circuit diagram showing the labels of an n–p–n bipolar transistor

A transistor can use a small signal applied between one pair of its terminals to control a much larger signal at another pair of terminals, a property called gain. It can produce a stronger output signal, a voltage or current, proportional to a weaker input signal, acting as an amplifier. It can also be used as an electrically controlled switch, where the amount of current is determined by other circuit elements.

There are two types of transistors, with slight differences in how they are used:

- A bipolar junction transistor (BJT) has terminals labeled base, collector and emitter. A small current at the base terminal, flowing between the base and the emitter, can control or switch a much larger current between the collector and emitter.
- A field-effect transistor (FET) has terminals labeled gate, source and drain. A voltage at the gate can control a current between source and drain.

The top image in this section represents a typical bipolar transistor in a circuit. A charge flows between emitter and collector terminals depending on the current in the base. Because the base and emitter connections behave like a semiconductor diode, a voltage drop develops between them. The amount of this drop, determined by the transistor's material, is referred to as V_{BE}. (Base Emitter Voltage)

=== Transistor as a switch ===
BJT used as an electronic switch in grounded-emitter configuration

Transistors are commonly used in digital circuits as electronic switches which can be either in an on or off state, both for high-power applications such as switched-mode power supplies and for low-power applications such as logic gates. Important parameters for this application include the current switched, the voltage handled, and the switching speed, characterized by the rise and fall times.

In a switching circuit, the goal is to simulate, as near as possible, the ideal switch having the properties of an open circuit when off, the short circuit when on, and an instantaneous transition between the two states. Parameters are chosen such that the off output is limited to leakage currents too small to affect connected circuitry, the resistance of the transistor in the on state is too small to affect circuitry, and the transition between the two states is fast enough not to have a detrimental effect.

In a grounded-emitter transistor circuit, such as the light-switch circuit shown, as the base voltage rises, the emitter and collector currents rise exponentially. The collector voltage drops because of reduced resistance from the collector to the emitter. If the voltage difference between the collector and emitter were zero (or near zero), the collector current would be limited only by the load resistance (light bulb) and the supply voltage. This is called saturation because the current is flowing from collector to emitter freely. When saturated, the switch is said to be on.

The use of bipolar transistors for switching applications requires biasing the transistor so that it operates between its cut-off region in the off-state and the saturation region (on). This requires sufficient base drive current. As the transistor provides current gain, it facilitates the switching of a relatively large current in the collector by a much smaller current into the base terminal. The ratio of these currents varies depending on the type of transistor, and even for a particular type, varies depending on the collector current. In the example of a light-switch circuit, as shown, the resistor is chosen to provide enough base current to ensure the transistor is saturated. The base resistor value is calculated from the supply voltage, transistor C-E junction voltage drop, collector current, and amplification factor beta.

=== Transistor as an amplifier ===
An amplifier circuit, a common-emitter configuration with a voltage-divider bias circuit

The common-emitter amplifier is designed so that a small change in voltage (V_{in}) changes the small current through the base of the transistor whose current amplification combined with the properties of the circuit means that small swings in V_{in} produce large changes in V_{out}.

Various configurations of single transistor amplifiers are possible, with some providing current gain, some voltage gain, and some both.

From mobile phones to televisions, vast numbers of products include amplifiers for sound reproduction, radio transmission, and signal processing. The first discrete-transistor audio amplifiers barely supplied a few hundred milliwatts, but power and audio fidelity gradually increased as better transistors became available and amplifier architecture evolved.

Modern transistor audio amplifiers of up to a few hundred watts are common and relatively inexpensive.

== Comparison with vacuum tubes ==
Before transistors were developed, vacuum tubes (or in the UK thermionic valves or just valves) were the main active components in electronic equipment.

=== Advantages ===
The key advantages that have allowed transistors to replace vacuum tubes in most applications are

- No cathode heater (which produces the characteristic orange glow of tubes), reducing power consumption, eliminating delay as tube heaters warm up, and immune from cathode poisoning and depletion.
- Very small size and weight, reducing equipment size.
- Large numbers of extremely small transistors can be manufactured as a single integrated circuit.
- Low operating voltages compatible with batteries of only a few cells.
- Circuits with greater energy efficiency are usually possible. For low-power applications (for example, voltage amplification) in particular, energy consumption can be very much less than for tubes.
- Complementary devices available, providing design flexibility including complementary-symmetry circuits, not possible with vacuum tubes.
- Very low sensitivity to mechanical shock and vibration, providing physical ruggedness and virtually eliminating shock-induced spurious signals (for example, microphonics in audio applications).
- Not susceptible to breakage of a glass envelope, leakage, outgassing, and other physical damage.

=== Limitations ===
Transistors may have the following limitations:

- They lack the higher electron mobility afforded by the vacuum of vacuum tubes, which is desirable for high-power, high-frequency operation – such as that used in some over-the-air television transmitters and in travelling-wave tubes used as amplifiers in some satellites
- Transistors and other solid-state devices are susceptible to damage from very brief electrical and thermal events, including electrostatic discharge in handling. Vacuum tubes are electrically much more rugged.
- They are sensitive to radiation and cosmic rays (special radiation-hardened chips are used for spacecraft devices).
- In audio applications, transistors lack the lower-harmonic distortion – the so-called tube sound – which is characteristic of vacuum tubes, and is preferred by some.

== Types ==
=== Classification ===
	PNP		P-channel
	NPN		N-channel
BJT		JFET

BJT and JFET symbols

Insulated-gate bipolar transistor (IGBT)

		P-channel
		N-channel
MOSFET enh	MOSFET dep

MOSFET symbols

Transistors are categorized by

- Structure: MOSFET (IGFET), BJT, JFET, insulated-gate bipolar transistor (IGBT), other type..
- Semiconductor material (dopants):
  - The metalloids; germanium (first used in 1947) and silicon (first used in 1954)—in amorphous, polycrystalline and monocrystalline form.
  - The compounds gallium arsenide (1966) and silicon carbide (1997).
  - The alloy silicon–germanium (1989)
  - The allotrope of carbon graphene (research ongoing since 2004), etc. (see Semiconductor material).
- Electrical polarity (positive and negative): NPN, PNP (BJTs), N-channel, P-channel (FETs).
- Maximum power rating: low, medium, high.
- Maximum operating frequency: low, medium, high, radio (RF), microwave frequency (the maximum effective frequency of a transistor in a common-emitter or common-source circuit is denoted by the term f_{T}, an abbreviation for transition frequency—the frequency at which the transistor yields unity voltage gain)
- Application: switch, general purpose, audio, high voltage, super-beta, matched pair.
- Physical packaging: through-hole metal, through-hole plastic, surface mount, ball grid array, power modules (see Packaging).
- Amplification factor h_{FE}, β_{F} (transistor beta) or g_{m} (transconductance).
- Working temperature: Extreme temperature transistors and traditional temperature transistors (−55 to 150 °C (−67 to 302 °F)). Extreme temperature transistors include high-temperature transistors (above 150 °C (302 °F)) and low-temperature transistors (below −55 °C (−67 °F)). The high-temperature transistors that operate thermally stable up to 250 °C (482 °F) can be developed by a general strategy of blending interpenetrating semi-crystalline conjugated polymers and high glass-transition temperature insulating polymers.

Hence, a particular transistor may be described as silicon, surface-mount, BJT, NPN, low-power, high-frequency switch.

=== Mnemonics ===
Convenient mnemonic to remember the type of transistor (represented by an electrical symbol) involves the direction of the arrow. For the BJT, on an n–p–n transistor symbol, the arrow will "Not Point iN". On a p–n–p transistor symbol, the arrow "Points iN Proudly". However, this does not apply to MOSFET-based transistor symbols as the arrow is typically reversed (i.e. the arrow for the n–p–n points inside).

=== Field-effect transistor (FET) ===
Operation of an FET and its I_{d}-V_{g} curve. At first, when no gate voltage is applied, there are no inversion electrons in the channel, so the device is turned off. As gate voltage increases, the inversion electron density in the channel increases, the current increases, and the device turns on.

The field-effect transistor, sometimes called a unipolar transistor, uses either electrons (in n-channel FET) or holes (in p-channel FET) for conduction. The four terminals of the FET are named source, gate, drain, and body (substrate). On most FETs, the body is connected to the source inside the package, and this will be assumed for the following description.

In a FET, the drain-to-source current flows via a conducting channel that connects the source region to the drain region. The conductivity is varied by the electric field that is produced when a voltage is applied between the gate and source terminals, hence the current flowing between the drain and source is controlled by the voltage applied between the gate and source. As the gate–source voltage (V_{GS}) is increased, the drain–source current (I_{DS}) increases exponentially for V_{GS} below threshold, and then at a roughly quadratic rate: (I_{DS} ∝ (V_{GS} − V_{T})^{2}, where V_{T} is the threshold voltage at which drain current begins) in the space-charge-limited region above threshold. A quadratic behavior is not observed in modern devices, for example, at the 65 nm technology node.

For low noise at narrow bandwidth, the higher input resistance of the FET is advantageous.

FETs are divided into two families: junction FET (JFET) and insulated gate FET (IGFET). The IGFET is more commonly known as a metal–oxide–semiconductor FET (MOSFET), reflecting its original construction from layers of metal (the gate), oxide (the insulation), and semiconductor. Unlike IGFETs, the JFET gate forms a p–n diode with the channel which lies between the source and drains. Functionally, this makes the n-channel JFET the solid-state equivalent of the vacuum tube triode which, similarly, forms a diode between its grid and cathode. Also, both devices operate in the depletion-mode, they both have a high input impedance, and they both conduct current under the control of an input voltage.

Metal–semiconductor FETs (MESFETs) are JFETs in which the reverse biased p–n junction is replaced by a metal–semiconductor junction. These, and the HEMTs (high-electron-mobility transistors, or HFETs), in which a two-dimensional electron gas with very high carrier mobility is used for charge transport, are especially suitable for use at very high frequencies (several GHz).

FETs are further divided into depletion-mode and enhancement-mode types, depending on whether the channel is turned on or off with zero gate-to-source voltage. For enhancement mode, the channel is off at zero bias, and a gate potential can enhance the conduction. For the depletion mode, the channel is on at zero bias, and a gate potential (of the opposite polarity) can deplete the channel, reducing conduction. For either mode, a more positive gate voltage corresponds to a higher current for n-channel devices and a lower current for p-channel devices. Nearly all JFETs are depletion-mode because the diode junctions would forward bias and conduct if they were enhancement-mode devices, while most IGFETs are enhancement-mode types.

==== Metal–oxide–semiconductor FET (MOSFET) ====
The metal–oxide–semiconductor field-effect transistor (MOSFET, MOS-FET, or MOS FET), also known as the metal–oxide–silicon transistor (MOS transistor, or MOS), is a type of field-effect transistor that is fabricated by the controlled oxidation of a semiconductor, typically silicon. It has an insulated gate, whose voltage determines the conductivity of the device. This ability to change conductivity with the amount of applied voltage can be used for amplifying or switching electronic signals. The MOSFET is by far the most common transistor, and the basic building block of most modern electronics. The MOSFET accounts for 99.9% of all transistors in the world.

=== Bipolar junction transistor (BJT) ===
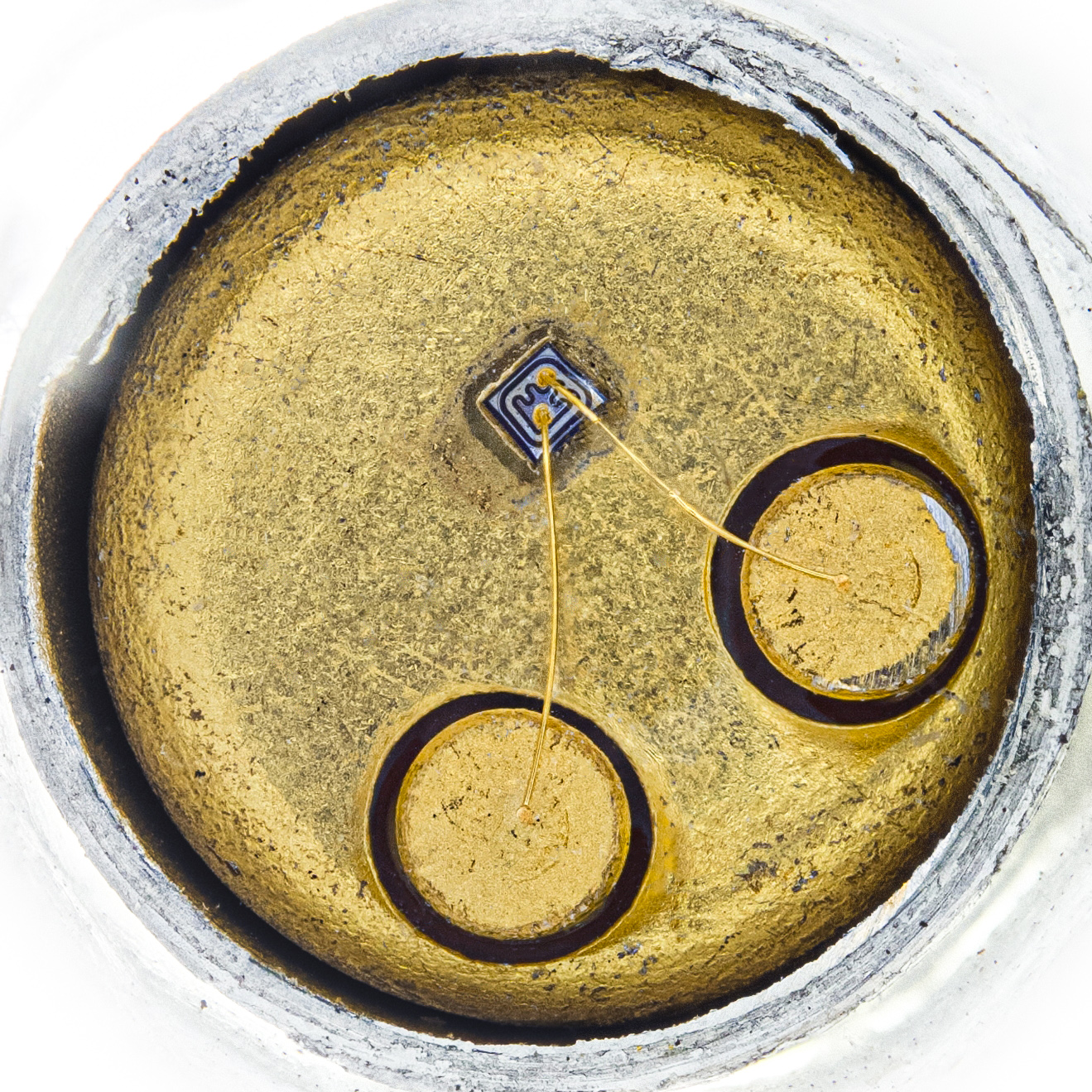
2N2222A NPN transistor

Bipolar transistors are so named because they conduct by using both majority and minority carriers. The bipolar junction transistor, the first type of transistor to be mass-produced, is a combination of two junction diodes and is formed of either a thin layer of p-type semiconductor sandwiched between two n-type semiconductors (an n–p–n transistor), or a thin layer of n-type semiconductor sandwiched between two p-type semiconductors (a p–n–p transistor). This construction produces two p–n junctions: a base–emitter junction and a base–collector junction, separated by a thin region of semiconductor known as the base region. (Two junction diodes wired together without sharing an intervening semiconducting region will not make a transistor.)

BJTs have three terminals, corresponding to the three layers of semiconductor—an emitter, a base, and a collector. They are useful in amplifiers because the currents at the emitter and collector are controllable by a relatively small base current. In an n–p–n transistor operating in the active region, the emitter–base junction is forward-biased (electrons and holes recombine at the junction), and the base–collector junction is reverse-biased (electrons and holes are formed at, and move away from, the junction), and electrons are injected into the base region. Because the base is narrow, most of these electrons will diffuse into the reverse-biased base–collector junction and be swept into the collector; perhaps one-hundredth of the electrons will recombine in the base, which is the dominant mechanism in the base current. Since the base is doped lightly (in comparison to the emitter and collector regions), recombination rates are low, permitting more carriers to diffuse across the base region. By controlling the number of electrons that can leave the base, the number of electrons entering the collector can be controlled. Collector current is approximately β (common-emitter current gain) times the base current. It is typically greater than 100 for small-signal transistors but can be smaller in transistors designed for high-power applications.

Unlike the field-effect transistor (see below), the BJT is a low-input-impedance device. Also, as the base–emitter voltage (V_{BE}) is increased, the base–emitter current and hence the collector–emitter current (I_{CE}) increase exponentially according to the Shockley diode model and the Ebers–Moll model. Because of this exponential relationship, the BJT has a higher transconductance than the FET.

Bipolar transistors can be made to conduct by exposure to light because the absorption of photons in the base region generates a photocurrent that acts as a base current; the collector current is approximately β times the photocurrent. Devices designed for this purpose have a transparent window in the package and are called phototransistors.

=== Usage of MOSFETs and BJTs ===
The MOSFET is by far the most widely used transistor for both digital circuits as well as analog circuits, accounting for 99.9% of all transistors in the world. The bipolar junction transistor (BJT) was previously the most commonly used transistor during the 1950s to 1960s. Even after MOSFETs became widely available in the 1970s, the BJT remained the transistor of choice for many analog circuits such as amplifiers because of their greater linearity, up until MOSFET devices (such as power MOSFETs, LDMOS and RF CMOS) replaced them for most power electronic applications in the 1980s. In integrated circuits, the desirable properties of MOSFETs allowed them to capture nearly all market share for digital circuits in the 1970s. Discrete MOSFETs (typically power MOSFETs) can be applied in transistor applications, including analog circuits, voltage regulators, amplifiers, power transmitters, and motor drivers.

=== Other transistor types ===
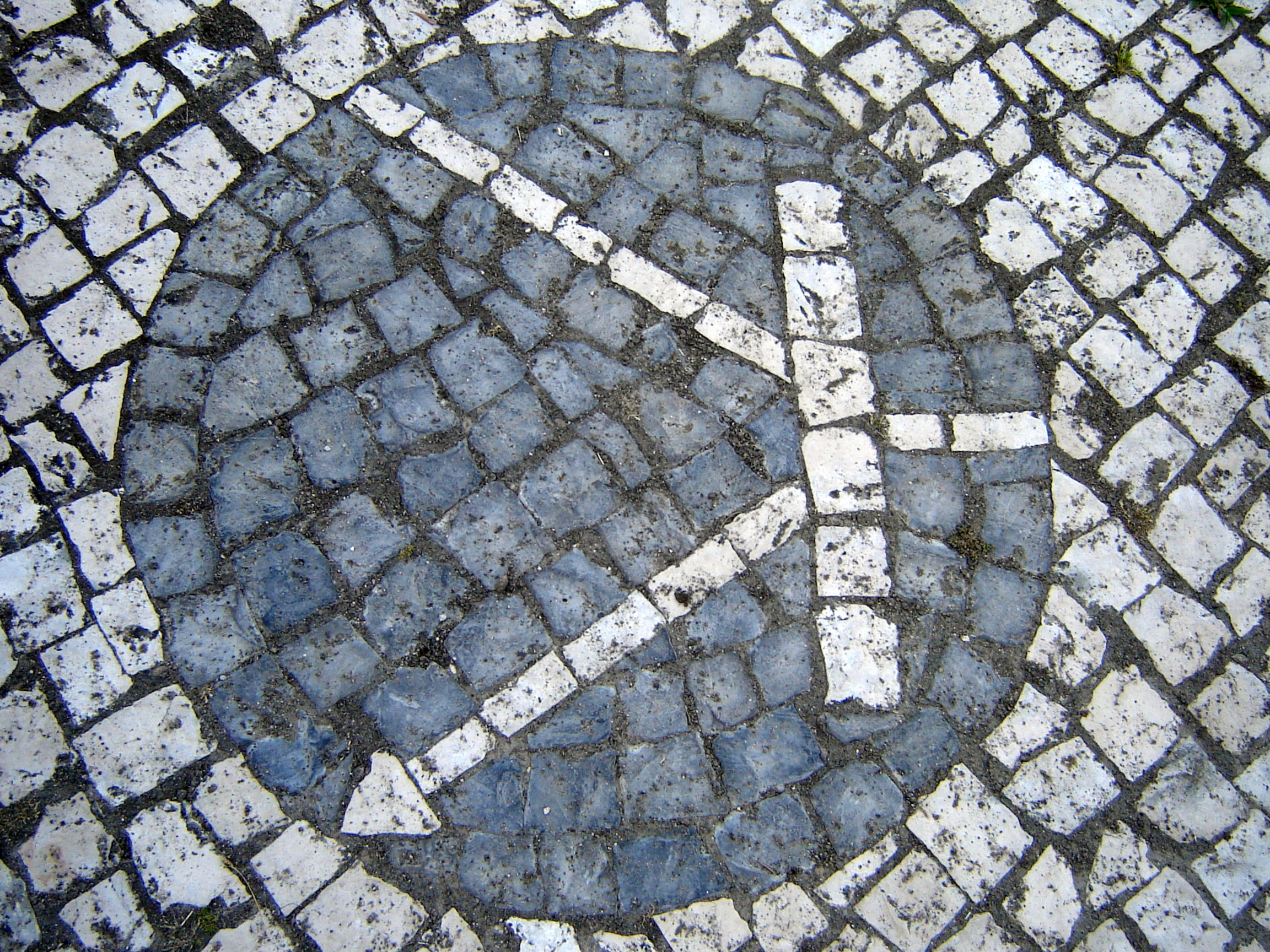
A transistor symbol created on Portuguese pavement at the University of Aveiro

- Field-effect transistor (FET):
  - Metal–oxide–semiconductor field-effect transistor (MOSFET), where the gate is insulated by a shallow layer of insulator
    - p-type MOS (PMOS)
    - n-type MOS (NMOS)
    - Complementary MOS (CMOS)
      - RF CMOS, for radiofrequency amplification, reception
    - Multi-gate field-effect transistor (MuGFET)
      - Fin field-effect transistor (FinFET), source/drain region shapes fins on the silicon surface
      - GAAFET, similar to FinFET but nanowires are used instead of fins, the nanowires are stacked vertically and are surrounded on 4 sides by the gate
      - MBCFET, a variant of GAAFET that uses horizontal nanosheets instead of nanowires, made by Samsung. Also known as RibbonFET (made by Intel) and as horizontal nanosheet transistor.
    - Thin-film transistor (TFT), used in LCD and OLED displays, types include amorphous silicon, LTPS, LTPO and IGZO transistors
    - Floating-gate MOSFET (FGMOS), for non-volatile storage
    - Power MOSFET, for power electronics
      - lateral diffused MOS (LDMOS)
  - Carbon nanotube field-effect transistor (CNFET, CNTFET), where the channel material is replaced by a carbon nanotube.
  - Ferroelectric field-effect transistor (Fe FET), uses ferroelectric materials
  - Junction gate field-effect transistor (JFET), where the gate is insulated by a reverse-biased p–n junction.
  - Metal–semiconductor field-effect transistor (MESFET), similar to JFET with a Schottky junction instead of a p–n junction
    - High-electron-mobility transistor (HEMT): GaN (gallium nitride), SiC (silicon carbide), Ga_{2}O_{3} (gallium oxide), GaAs (gallium arsenide) transistors, MOSFETs, etc.
  - Negative-capacitance FET (NC-FET)
  - Inverted-T field-effect transistor (ITFET)
  - Fast-reverse epitaxial diode field-effect transistor (FREDFET)
  - Organic field-effect transistor (OFET), in which the semiconductor is an organic compound.
  - Ballistic transistor (disambiguation)
  - FETs used to sense the environment
    - Ion-sensitive field-effect transistor (ISFET), to measure ion concentrations in solution
    - Electrolyte–oxide–semiconductor field-effect transistor (EOSFET), neurochip,
    - Deoxyribonucleic acid field-effect transistor (DNAFET).
    - Field-effect transistor-based biosensor (Bio-FET)
- Bipolar junction transistor (BJT):
  - Heterojunction bipolar transistor, up to several hundred GHz, common in modern ultrafast and RF circuits
  - Schottky transistor
  - avalanche transistor
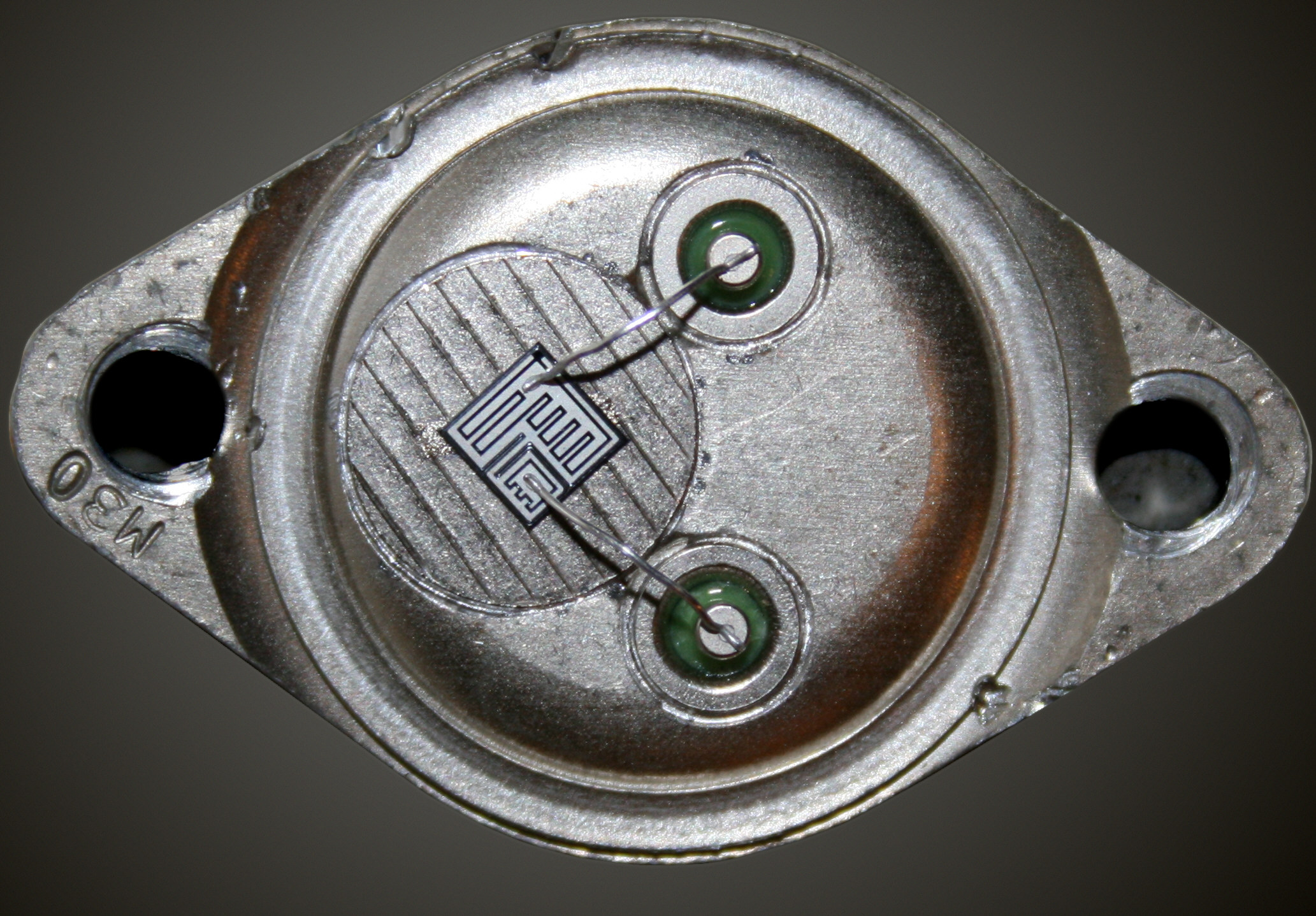
  - A Darlington transistor with the upper case removed so the transistor chip (the small square) can be seen. It is effectively two transistors on the same chip. One is much larger than the other, but both are large in comparison to transistors in large-scale integration because this particular example is intended for power applications.
    Darlington transistors are two BJTs connected together to provide a high current gain equal to the product of the current gains of the two transistors
  - Insulated-gate bipolar transistors (IGBTs) use a medium-power IGFET, similarly connected to a power BJT, to give a high input impedance. Power diodes are often connected between certain terminals depending on specific use. IGBTs are particularly suitable for heavy-duty industrial applications. The ASEA Brown Boveri (ABB) 5SNA2400E170100 , intended for three-phase power supplies, houses three n–p–n IGBTs in a case measuring 38 by 140 by 190 mm and weighing 1.5 kg. Each IGBT is rated at 1,700 volts and can handle 2,400 amperes
  - Phototransistor
  - Emitter-switched bipolar transistor (ESBT) is a monolithic configuration of a high-voltage bipolar transistor and a low-voltage power MOSFET in cascode topology. It was introduced by STMicroelectronics in the 2000s, and abandoned a few years later around 2012.
  - Multiple-emitter transistor, used in transistor–transistor logic and integrated current mirrors
  - Multiple-base transistor, used to amplify very-low-level signals in noisy environments such as the pickup of a record player or radio front ends. Effectively, it is a very large number of transistors in parallel where, at the output, the signal is added constructively, but random noise is added only stochastically.
- Tunnel field-effect transistor, where it switches by modulating quantum tunneling through a barrier.
- Diffusion transistor, formed by diffusing dopants into semiconductor substrate; can be both BJT and FET.
- Unijunction transistor, which can be used as a simple pulse generator. It comprises the main body of either p-type or n-type semiconductor with ohmic contacts at each end (terminals Base1 and Base2). A junction with the opposite semiconductor type is formed at a point along the length of the body for the third terminal (Emitter).
- Single-electron transistors (SET), consist of a gate island between two tunneling junctions. The tunneling current is controlled by a voltage applied to the gate through a capacitor.
- Nanofluidic transistor, controls the movement of ions through sub-microscopic, water-filled channels.
- Multigate devices:
  - Tetrode transistor
  - Pentode transistor
  - Trigate transistor (prototype by Intel)
  - Dual-gate field-effect transistors have a single channel with two gates in cascode, a configuration optimized for high-frequency amplifiers, mixers, and oscillators.
- Junctionless nanowire transistor (JNT), uses a simple nanowire of silicon surrounded by an electrically isolated wedding ring that acts to gate the flow of electrons through the wire.
- Nanoscale vacuum-channel transistor, when in 2012, NASA and the National Nanofab Center in South Korea were reported to have built a prototype vacuum-channel transistor in only 150 nanometers in size, can be manufactured cheaply using standard silicon semiconductor processing, can operate at high speeds even in hostile environments, and could consume just as much power as a standard transistor.
- Organic electrochemical transistor.
- Solaristor (from solar cell transistor), a two-terminal gate-less self-powered phototransistor.
- Germanium–tin transistor
- Wood transistor
- Paper transistor
- Carbon-doped silicon–germanium (Si–Ge:C) transistor
- Diamond transistor
- Aluminum nitride transistor
- Super-lattice castellated field effect transistors

== Device identification ==
Three major identification standards are used for designating transistor devices. In each, the alphanumeric prefix provides clues to the type of the device.

=== Joint Electron Device Engineering Council (JEDEC) ===
The JEDEC part numbering scheme evolved in the 1960s in the United States. The JEDEC EIA-370 transistor device numbers usually start with 2N, indicating a three-terminal device. Dual-gate field-effect transistors are four-terminal devices, and begin with 3N. The prefix is followed by a two-, three- or four-digit number with no significance as to device properties, although early devices with low numbers tend to be germanium devices. For example, 2N3055 is a silicon n–p–n power transistor, 2N1301 is a p–n–p germanium switching transistor. A letter suffix, such as A, is sometimes used to indicate a newer variant, but rarely gain groupings.

JEDEC prefix table
Prefix	Type and usage
1N	two-terminal device, such as diodes
2N	three-terminal device, such as transistors or single-gate field-effect transistors
3N	four-terminal device, such as dual-gate field-effect transistors

=== Japanese Industrial Standard (JIS) ===
In Japan, the JIS semiconductor designation (|JIS-C-7012), labels transistor devices starting with 2S, e.g., 2SD965, but sometimes the 2S prefix is not marked on the package–a 2SD965 might only be marked D965 and a 2SC1815 might be listed by a supplier as simply C1815. This series sometimes has suffixes, such as R, O, BL, standing for red, orange, blue, etc., to denote variants, such as tighter h_{FE} (gain) groupings.

JIS transistor prefix table
Prefix	Type and usage
2SA	high-frequency p–n–p BJT
2SB	audio-frequency p–n–p BJT
2SC	high-frequency n–p–n BJT
2SD	audio-frequency n–p–n BJT
2SJ	P-channel FET (both JFET and MOSFET)
2SK	N-channel FET (both JFET and MOSFET)

=== European Electronic Component Manufacturers Association (EECA) ===
The European Electronic Component Manufacturers Association (EECA) uses a numbering scheme that was inherited from Pro Electron when it merged with EECA in 1983. This scheme begins with two letters: the first gives the semiconductor type (A for germanium, B for silicon, and C for materials like GaAs); the second letter denotes the intended use (A for diode, C for general-purpose transistor, etc.). A three-digit sequence number (or one letter and two digits, for industrial types) follows. With early devices this indicated the case type. Suffixes may be used, with a letter (e.g. C often means high h_{FE}, such as in: BC549C) or other codes may follow to show gain (e.g. BC327-25) or voltage rating (e.g. BUK854-800A). The more common prefixes are:

EECA transistor prefix table
Prefix	Type and usage	Example	Equivalent	Reference
AC	Germanium, small-signal AF transistor	AC126	NTE102A	
AD	Germanium, AF power transistor	AD133	NTE179	
AF	Germanium, small-signal RF transistor	AF117	NTE160	
AL	Germanium, RF power transistor	ALZ10	NTE100	
AS	Germanium, switching transistor	ASY28	NTE101	
AU	Germanium, power switching transistor	AU103	NTE127	
BC	Silicon, small-signal transistor ("general purpose")	BC548	2N3904	Datasheet
BD	Silicon, power transistor	BD139	NTE375	Datasheet
BF	Silicon, RF (high frequency) BJT or FET	BF245	NTE133	Datasheet
BS	Silicon, switching transistor (BJT or MOSFET)	BS170	2N7000	Datasheet
BL	Silicon, high frequency, high power (for transmitters)	BLW60	NTE325	Datasheet
BU	Silicon, high voltage (for CRT horizontal deflection circuits)	BU2520A	NTE2354	Datasheet
CF	Gallium arsenide, small-signal microwave transistor (MESFET)	CF739	—	Datasheet
CL	Gallium arsenide, microwave power transistor (FET)	CLY10	—	Datasheet

=== Proprietary ===
Manufacturers of devices may have their proprietary numbering system, for example CK722. Since devices are second-sourced, a manufacturer's prefix (like MPF in MPF102, which originally would denote a Motorola FET) now is an unreliable indicator of who made the device. Some proprietary naming schemes adopt parts of other naming schemes, for example, a PN2222A is a (possibly Fairchild Semiconductor) 2N2222A in a plastic case (but a PN108 is a plastic version of a BC108, not a 2N108, while the PN100 is unrelated to other xx100 devices).

Military part numbers sometimes are assigned their codes, such as the British Military CV Naming System.

Manufacturers buying large numbers of similar parts may have them supplied with house numbers, identifying a particular purchasing specification and not necessarily a device with a standardized registered number. For example, an HP part 1854,0053 is a (JEDEC) 2N2218 transistor which is also assigned the CV number: CV7763

=== Naming problems ===
With so many independent naming schemes, and the abbreviation of part numbers when printed on the devices, ambiguity sometimes occurs. For example, two different devices may be marked J176 (one the J176 low-power JFET, the other the higher-powered MOSFET 2SJ176).

As older through-hole transistors are given surface-mount packaged counterparts, they tend to be assigned many different part numbers because manufacturers have their systems to cope with the variety in pinout arrangements and options for dual or matched n–p–n + p–n–p devices in one pack. So even when the original device (such as a 2N3904) may have been assigned by a standards authority, and well known by engineers over the years, the new versions are far from standardized in their naming.

== Construction ==
=== Semiconductor material ===
Semiconductor material characteristics
Semiconductor material	Junction forward voltage @ 25 °C, V	Electron mobility @ 25 °C, m^{2}/(V·s)	Hole mobility @ 25 °C, m^{2}/(V·s)	Max. junction temp., °C
Ge	0.27	0.39	0.19	70 to 100
Si	0.71	0.14	0.05	150 to 200
GaAs	1.03	0.85	0.05	150 to 200
Al–Si junction	0.3	—	—	150 to 200

The first BJTs were made from germanium (Ge). Silicon (Si) types currently predominate but certain advanced microwave and high-performance versions now employ the compound semiconductor material gallium arsenide (GaAs) and the semiconductor alloy silicon–germanium (SiGe). Single-element semiconductor material (Ge and Si) is described as elemental.

Rough parameters for the most common semiconductor materials used to make transistors are given in the adjacent table. These parameters will vary with an increase in temperature, electric field, impurity level, strain, and sundry other factors.

The junction forward voltage is the voltage applied to the emitter-base junction of a BJT to make the base conduct a specified current. The current increases exponentially as the junction forward voltage is increased. The values given in the table are typical for a current of 1 mA (the same values apply to semiconductor diodes). The lower the junction forward voltage the better, as this means that less power is required to drive the transistor. The junction forward voltage for a given current decreases with an increase in temperature. For a typical silicon junction, the change is −2.1 mV/°C. In some circuits special compensating elements (sensistors) must be used to compensate for such changes.

The density of mobile carriers in the channel of a MOSFET is a function of the electric field forming the channel and of various other phenomena such as the impurity level in the channel. Some impurities, called dopants, are introduced deliberately in making a MOSFET, to control the MOSFET electrical behavior.

The electron mobility and hole mobility columns show the average speed that electrons and holes diffuse through the semiconductor material with an electric field of 1 volt per meter applied across the material. In general, the higher the electron mobility the faster the transistor can operate. The table indicates that Ge is a better material than Si in this respect. However, Ge has four major shortcomings compared to silicon and gallium arsenide:

1. Its maximum temperature is limited.
2. It has relatively high leakage current.
3. It cannot withstand high voltages.
4. It is less suitable for fabricating integrated circuits.

Because the electron mobility is higher than the hole mobility for all semiconductor materials, a given bipolar n–p–n transistor tends to be swifter than an equivalent p–n–p transistor. GaAs has the highest electron mobility of the three semiconductors. It is for this reason that GaAs is used in high-frequency applications. A relatively recent FET development, the high-electron-mobility transistor (HEMT), has a heterostructure (junction between different semiconductor materials) of aluminium gallium arsenide (AlGaAs)-gallium arsenide (GaAs) which has twice the electron mobility of a GaAs-metal barrier junction. Because of their high speed and low noise, HEMTs are used in satellite receivers working at frequencies around 12 GHz. HEMTs based on gallium nitride and aluminum gallium nitride (AlGaN/GaN HEMTs) provide still higher electron mobility and are being developed for various applications.

Maximum junction temperature values represent a cross-section taken from various manufacturers' datasheets. This temperature should not be exceeded or the transistor may be damaged.

Al–Si junction refers to the high-speed (aluminum-silicon) metal–semiconductor barrier diode, commonly known as a Schottky diode. This is included in the table because some silicon power IGFETs have a parasitic reverse Schottky diode formed between the source and drain as part of the fabrication process. This diode can be a nuisance, but sometimes it is used in the circuit.

=== Packaging ===
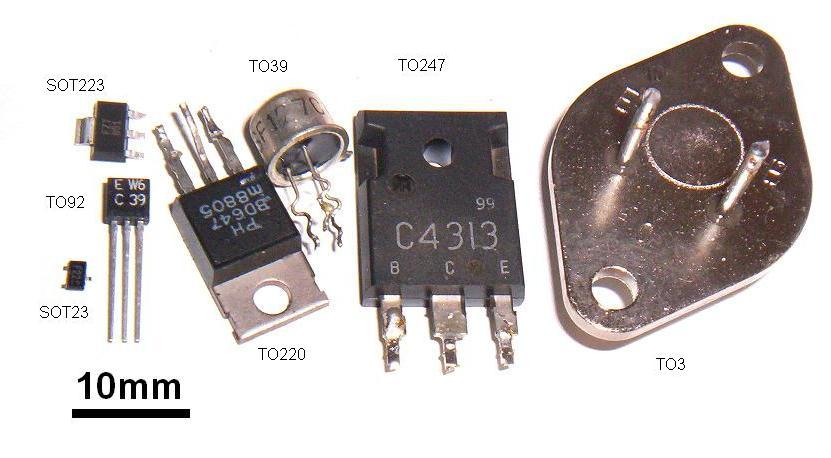
Assorted discrete transistors

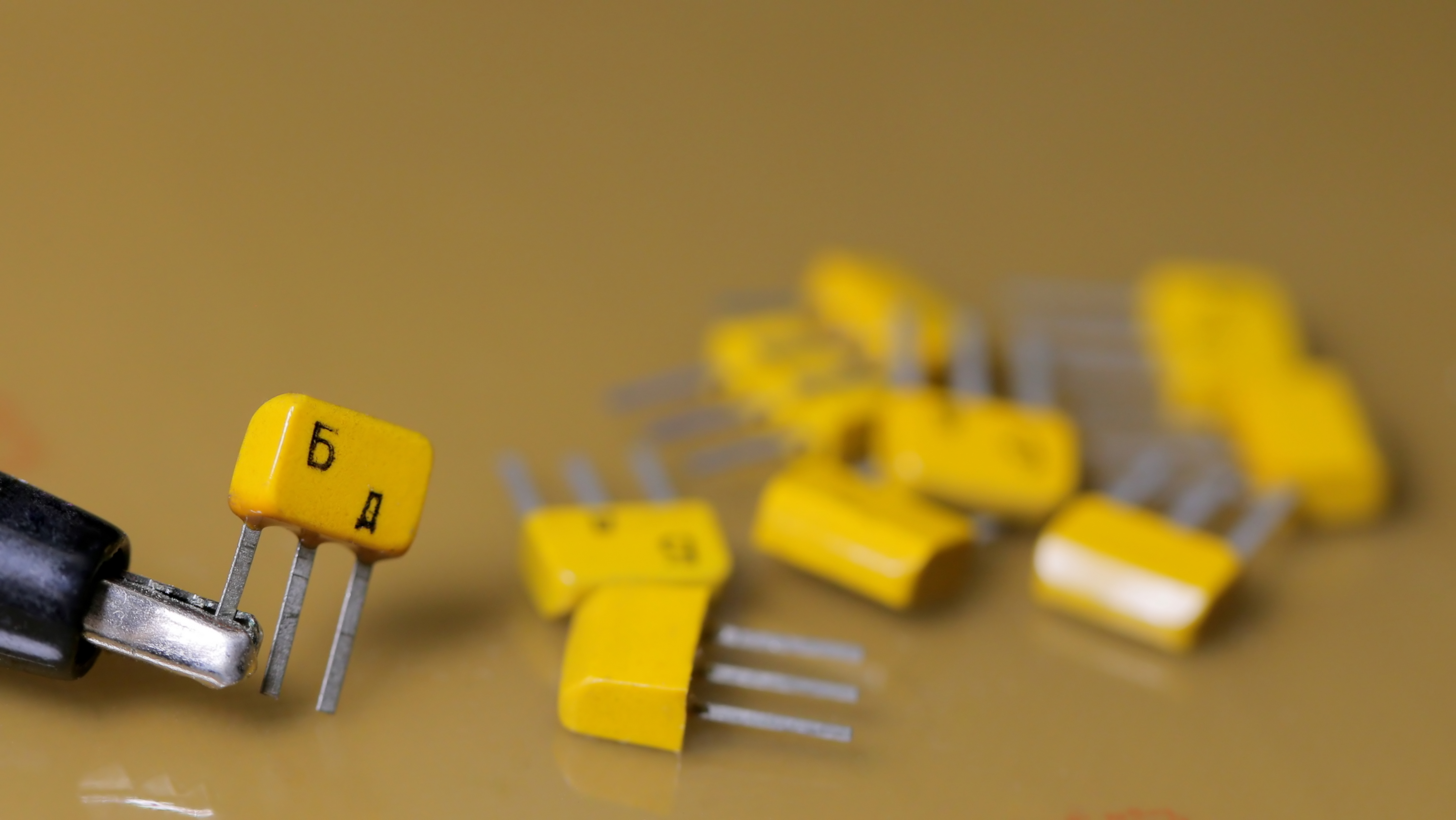
Soviet-manufactured KT315b transistors

Discrete transistors can be individually packaged transistors or unpackaged transistor chips.

Transistors come in many different semiconductor packages (see image). The two main categories are through-hole (or leaded), and surface-mount, also known as surface-mount device (SMD). The ball grid array (BGA) is the latest surface-mount package. It has solder balls on the underside in place of leads. Because they are smaller and have shorter interconnections, SMDs have better high-frequency characteristics but lower power ratings.

Transistor packages are made of glass, metal, ceramic, or plastic. The package often dictates the power rating and frequency characteristics. Power transistors have larger packages that can be clamped to heat sinks for enhanced cooling. Additionally, most power transistors have the collector or drain physically connected to the metal enclosure. At the other extreme, some surface-mount microwave transistors are as small as grains of sand.

Often a given transistor type is available in several packages. Transistor packages are mainly standardized, but the assignment of a transistor's functions to the terminals is not: other transistor types can assign other functions to the package's terminals. Even for the same transistor type the terminal assignment can vary (normally indicated by a suffix letter to the part number, q.e. BC212L and BC212K).

Nowadays most transistors come in a wide range of SMT packages. In comparison, the list of available through-hole packages is relatively small. Here is a short list of the most common through-hole transistors packages in alphabetical order: ATV, E-line, MRT, HRT, SC-43, SC-72, TO-3, TO-18, TO-39, TO-92, TO-126, TO220, TO247, TO251, TO262, ZTX851.

Unpackaged transistor chips (die) may be assembled into hybrid devices. The IBM SLT module of the 1960s is one example of such a hybrid circuit module using glass passivated transistor (and diode) die. Other packaging techniques for discrete transistors as chips include direct chip attach (DCA) and chip-on-board (COB).

==== Flexible transistors ====
Researchers have made several kinds of flexible transistors, including organic field-effect transistors. Flexible transistors are useful in some kinds of flexible displays and other flexible electronics.

== See also ==
- Alpha cutoff frequency
- Band gap
- Digital electronics
- Diffused junction transistor
- Moore's law
- Optical transistor
- Magneto-electric spin-orbit
- Nanoelectromechanical relay
- Outline of semiconductors
- Semiconductor device modeling
- Transistor count
- Transistor model
- Transresistance
- Very large scale integration
- Trancitor
