= Kenbak-1 =

Personal computer, invented in 1970

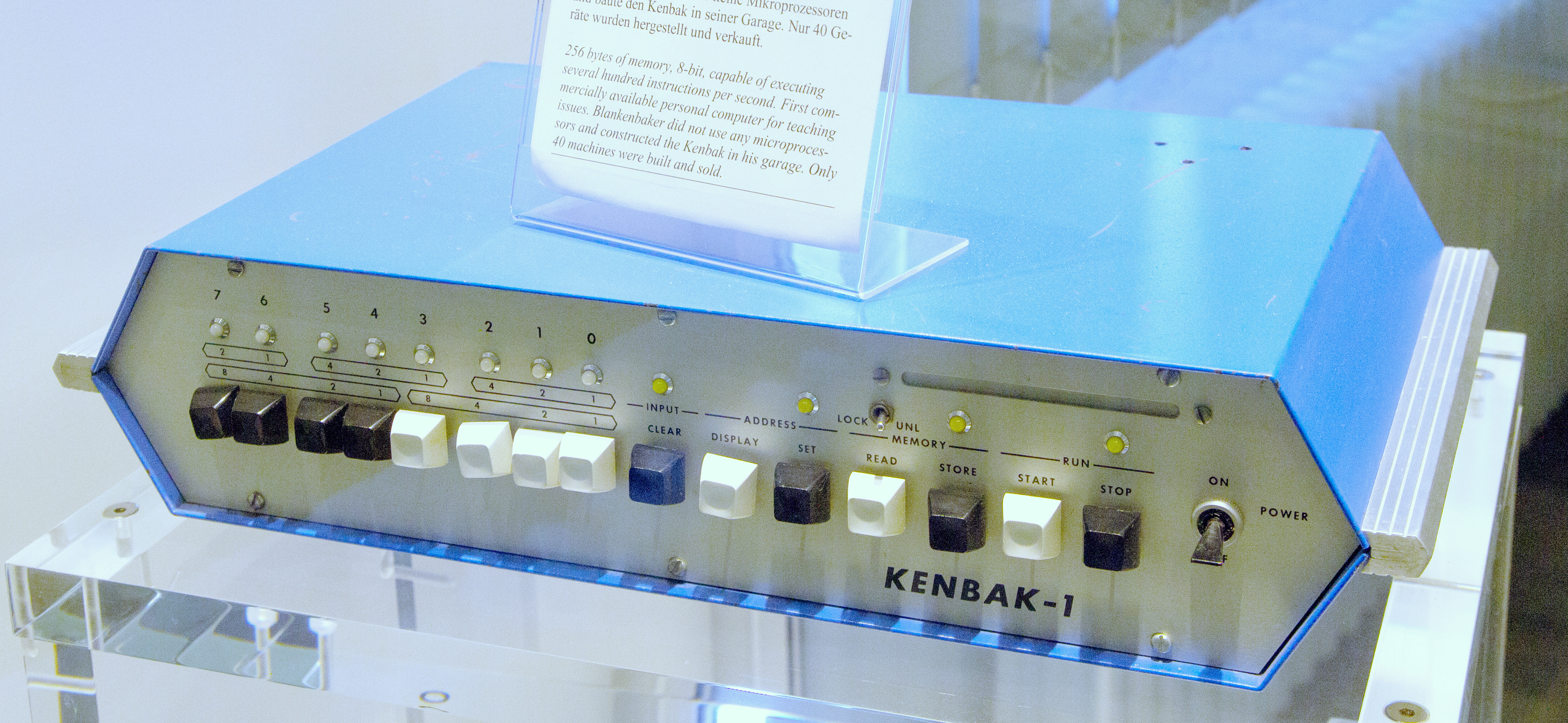
- A Kenbak-1 at Deutsches Museum, Munich
- Developer: John Blankenbaker
- Manufacturer: Kenbak Corporation
- Type: Personal computer
- Released: 1971; 55 years ago
- Introductory price: US$750 (equivalent to $5,820 in 2024)
- Discontinued: 1973
- Units sold: 44
- Memory: 256 bytes of memory

A program running in a Kenbak-1 IDE/emulator. Click to start animation. Note that the program's sole use is to show lights being shifted.

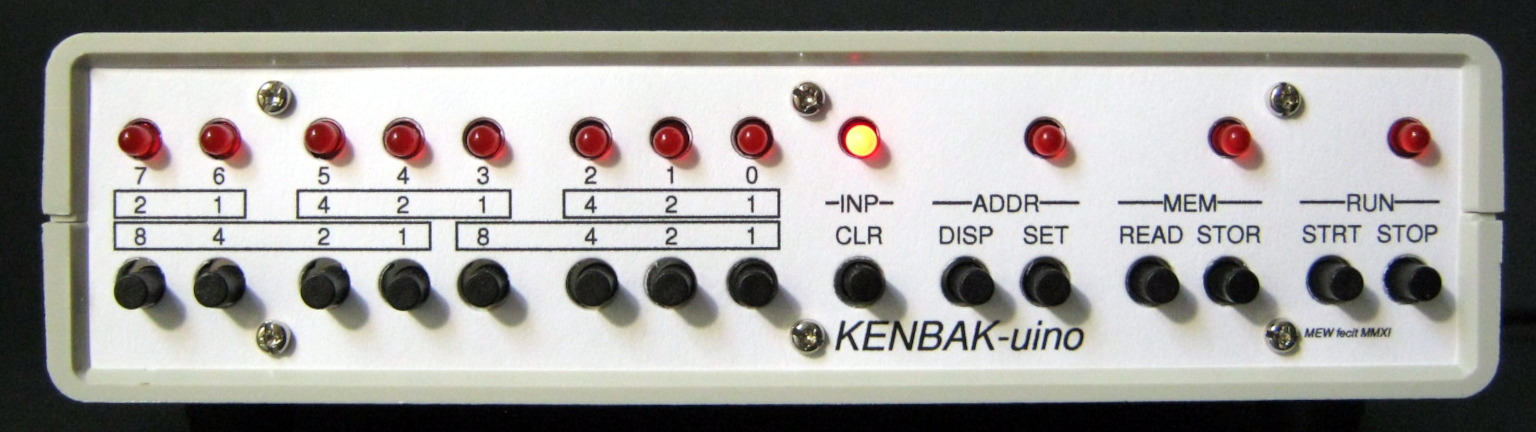
Kenbakuino, an Arduino-based Kenbak-1 emulator

The Kenbak-1 is a personal computer released in early 1971 by the Kenbak Corporation. Designed in 1970 by John Blankenbaker (born 1929), the Kenbak-1 is considered by several institutions, including the Computer History Museum, the Mimms Museum of Technology and Art and the American Computer Museum, to be the world's first commercially released personal computer. Less than 50 units were ever built, using Bud Industries enclosures as a housing. The system first sold for US$750 (equivalent to about $5,800 in 2024). As of 2025, only 14 machines are known to exist worldwide, in the hands of various collectors and museums. Production of the Kenbak-1 stopped in 1973, as Kenbak failed and was taken over by CTI Education Products, Inc. CTI rebranded the inventory and renamed it the 5050, though sales remained elusive.

Since the Kenbak-1 was invented before the first microprocessor, the machine did not have a one-chip CPU but was instead based purely on 7400-series TTL chips. The 8-bit machine offered 256 bytes of memory, implemented on Intel's type 1404A silicon gate MOS shift registers. The clock signal period was 1 microsecond (equivalent to a clock speed of 1 MHz), but the program speed averaged below 1,000 instructions per second due the many clock cycles needed for each operation and slow access to serial memory.

The machine was programmed in pure machine code using an array of buttons and switches. Output consisted of a row of lights.

Internally, the Kenbak-1 has a serial computer architecture, processing one bit at a time.

== Technical description ==
=== Registers ===
Kenbak-1 registers
^{0}_{7}	^{0}_{6}	^{0}_{5}	^{0}_{4}	^{0}_{3}	^{0}_{2}	^{0}_{1}	^{0}_{0}	(bit position)
- Main registers
A	A
B	B
X	X (Index)
P	Program Counter
- Flags
000000	C	O	A flags
000000	C	O	B flags
000000	C	O	X flags
- Input/Output
Output	Lights
Input	Switches

The Kenbak-1 has a total of nine registers. All are memory mapped. It has three general-purpose registers: A, B and X. Register A is the implicit destination of some operations. Register X, also known as the index register, turns the direct and indirect modes into indexed direct and indexed indirect modes. It also has a program counter, called Register P, three "overflow and carry" registers for A, B and X, respectively, as well as an Input Register and an Output Register.

=== Addressing modes ===
Add, Subtract, Load, Store, Load Complement, And, and Or instructions operate between a register and another operand using five addressing modes:

- Immediate (operand is in second byte of instruction)
- Memory (second byte of instruction is the address of the operand)
- Indirect (second byte of instruction is the address of the address of the operand)
- Indexed (second byte of instruction is added to X to form the address of the operand)
- Indirect Indexed (second byte of instruction points to a location which is added to X to form the address of the operand)

=== Instruction table ===
The instructions are encoded in 8 bits, with a possible second byte providing an immediate value or address. Some instructions have multiple possible encodings.

Opcode matrix for the Kenbak-1 instruction set
High octal digits	Low octal digit							
High octal digits	0	1	2	3	4	5	6	7
00	HALT	SFTR A1	SET 0 b0 XXX	ADD A #XXX	ADD A XXX	ADD A (XXX)	ADD A XXX, X	ADD A (XXX), X
01	HALT	SFTR A2	SET 0 b1 XXX	SUB A #XXX	SUB A XXX	SUB A (XXX)	SUB A XXX, X	SUB A (XXX), X
02	HALT	SFTR A3	SET 0 b2 XXX	LOAD A #XXX	LOAD A XXX	LOAD A (XXX)	LOAD A XXX, X	LOAD A (XXX), X
03	HALT	SFTR A4	SET 0 b3 XXX	STORE A #XXX	STORE A XXX	STORE A (XXX)	STORE A XXX, X	STORE A (XXX), X
04	HALT	SFTR B1	SET 0 b4 XXX	JPD A ≠0 XXX	JPD A =0 XXX	JPD A <0 XXX	JPD A ≥0 XXX	JPD A >0 XXX
05	HALT	SFTR B2	SET 0 b5 XXX	JPI A ≠0 XXX	JPI A =0 XXX	JPI A <0 XXX	JPI A ≥0 XXX	JPI A >0 XXX
06	HALT	SFTR B3	SET 0 b6 XXX	JMD A ≠0 XXX	JMD A =0 XXX	JMD A <0 XXX	JMD A ≥0 XXX	JMD A >0 XXX
07	HALT	SFTR B4	SET 0 b7 XXX	JMI A ≠0 XXX	JMI A =0 XXX	JMI A <0 XXX	JMI A ≥0	JMI A >0 XXX
10	HALT	ROTR A1	SET 1 b0 XXX	ADD B #XXX	ADD B XXX	ADD B (XXX)	ADD B XXX, X	ADD B (XXX), X
11	HALT	ROTR A2	SET 1 b1 XXX	SUB B #XXX	SUB B XXX	SUB B (XXX)	SUB B XXX, X	SUB B (XXX), X
12	HALT	ROTR A3	SET 1 b2 XXX	LOAD B #XXX	LOAD B XXX	LOAD B (XXX)	LOAD B XXX, X	LOAD B (XXX), X
13	HALT	ROTR A4	SET 1 b3 XXX	STORE B #XXX	STORE B XXX	STORE B (XXX)	STORE B XXX, X	STORE B (XXX), X
14	HALT	ROTR B1	SET 1 b4 XXX	JPD B ≠0 XXX	JPD B =0 XXX	JPD B <0 XXX	JPD B ≥0 XXX	JPD B >0 XXX
15	HALT	ROTR B2	SET 1 b5 XXX	JPI B ≠0 XXX	JPI B =0 XXX	JPI B <0 XXX	JPI B ≥0 XXX	JPI B >0 XXX
16	HALT	ROTR B3	SET 1 b6 XXX	JMD B ≠0 XXX	JMD B =0 XXX	JMD B <0 XXX	JMD B ≥0 XXX	JMD B >0 XXX
17	HALT	ROTR B4	SET 1 b7 XXX	JMI B ≠0 XXX	JMI B =0 XXX	JMI B <0 XXX	JMI B ≥0 XXX	JMI B >0 XXX
20	NOOP	SFTL A1	SKP 0 b0 XXX	ADD X #XXX	ADD X XXX	ADD X (XXX)	ADD X XXX, X	ADD X (XXX), X
21	NOOP	SFTL A2	SKP 0 b1 XXX	SUB X #XXX	SUB X XXX	SUB X (XXX)	SUB X XXX, X	SUB X (XXX), X
22	NOOP	SFTL A3	SKP 0 b2 XXX	LOAD X #XXX	LOAD X XXX	LOAD X (XXX)	LOAD X (XXX)	LOAD X (XXX), X
23	NOOP	SFTL A4	SKP 0 b3 XXX	STORE X #XXX	STORE X XXX	STORE X (XXX)	STORE X XXX, X	STORE X (XXX), X
24	NOOP	SFTL B1	SKP 0 b4 XXX	JPD X ≠0 XXX	JPD X =0 XXX	JPD X <0 XXX	JPD X ≥0 XXX, X	JPD X >0 XXX
25	NOOP	SFTL B2	SKP 0 b5 XXX	JPI X ≠0 XXX	JPI X =0 XXX	JPI X <0 XXX	JPI X ≥0 XXX	JPI X >0 XXX
26	NOOP	SFTL B3	SKP 0 b6 XXX	JMD X ≠0 XXX	JMD X =0 XXX	JMD X <0 XXX	JMD X ≥0 XXX	JMD X >0 XXX
27	NOOP	SFTL B4	SKP 0 b7 XXX	JMI X ≠0 XXX	JMI X =0 XXX	JMI X <0 XXX	JMI X ≥0 XXX	JMI X >0 XXX
30	NOOP	ROTL A1	SKP 1 b0 XXX	OR #XXX	OR XXX	OR (XXX)	OR XXX, X	OR (XXX), X
31	NOOP	ROTL A2	SKP 1 b1 XXX	—	—	—	—	—
32	NOOP	ROTL A3	SKP 1 b2 XXX	AND #XXX	AND XXX	AND (XXX)	AND XXX, X	AND (XXX), X
33	NOOP	ROTL A4	SKP 1 b3 XXX	LNEG #XXX	LNEG XXX	LNEG (XXX)	LNEG XXX, X	LNEG (XXX), X
34	NOOP	ROTL B1	SKP 1 b4 XXX	JPD UNC XXX	JPD UNC XXX	JPD UNC XXX	JPD UNC XXX	JPD UNC XXX
35	NOOP	ROTL B2	SKP 1 b5 XXX	JPI UNC XXX	JPI UNC XXX	JPI UNC XXX	JPI UNC XXX	JPI UNC XXX
36	NOOP	ROTL B3	SKP 1 b6 XXX	JMD UNC XXX	JMD UNC XXX	JMD UNC XXX	JMD UNC XXX	JMD UNC XXX
37	NOOP	ROTL B4	SKP 1 b7 XXX	JMI UNC XXX	JMI UNC XXX	JMI UNC XXX	JMI UNC XXX	JMI UNC XXX

== History ==
The Kenbak-1, released in early 1971, is considered by the Computer History Museum to be the world's first personal computer. It was designed and invented by John Blankenbaker of Kenbak Corporation in 1970, and was first sold in early 1971. Unlike a modern personal computer, the Kenbak-1 was built of small-scale integrated circuits, and did not use a microprocessor. The system first sold for US$750 (equivalent to about $5,800 in 2024).. Only 44 machines were ever sold, though it's said 50 to 52 were built. In 1973, production of the Kenbak-1 stopped as Kenbak Corporation folded.

With a fixed 256 bytes of memory, input and output restricted to lights and switches (no ports or serial output), and no possible way to extend its capabilities, the Kenbak-1 was only really useful for educational use. In contrast, the 1975 Altair 8800 had expansion slots, allowing the addition of memory and peripherals.

== See also ==
- Datapoint 2200, a contemporary machine with alphanumeric screen and keyboard, suitable to run non-trivial application programs
- Mark-8, designed by graduate student Jonathan A. Titus and announced as a "loose kit" in the July 1974 issue of Radio-Electronics magazine
- Altair 8800, a very popular 1975 microcomputer that provided the inspiration for starting Microsoft
- Gigatron TTL, a 21st-century implementation of a computer using small-scale integration parts
