= Bud Industries =

Bud Industries, Inc.
- Type: Private
- Industry: Enclosure (electrical)
- Founded: 1928
- Key people: Blair Haas, CEO; Josiah Haas, President
- Number of employees: 120
- Website: http://www.budind.com

Bud Industries is a manufacturer and supplier of electronics enclosures founded by Max Haas in 1928 and based in Willoughby, Ohio near Cleveland.

The majority of Bud electronics enclosures are sold through more than 150 independent distributors, including Digi-Key, Newark, Allied Electronics, Master Electronics, and Mouser Electronics.

== History ==
Max Haas was an electronics salesman who started the company to manufacture an "antenna eliminator" that attached to the back of a radio and eliminated the need for a rooftop antenna. Later Haas modified the product to fit automobiles and other devices. The company name came from the nickname of Mr. Haas's son, Alvin.

Haas started selling his product in Cleveland, Ohio. Bud Industries expanded into producing radio kits and parts for ham radios, followed by radio coils, condensers and enclosures. By the mid-1930s, the Bud Industries product catalog ranged from small metal relay racks to large electrical mounting equipment. Bud's model 123 pentode adapter (tube socket adapter) from 1929 is currently on display at the Smithsonian Institution.

The company expanded into producing mini box enclosures, which became known among electronics students and engineers as "bud boxes." The company also started producing relay racks, cabinets and other enclosures designed to house industrial electronic equipment, a large cabinet rack being called a BudRack.

Upon Mr. Haas's death, control of the company moved to his son, Alvin "Bud" Haas, who moved the Bud manufacturing facility just outside Cleveland to Willoughby, Ohio. In 1976, Bud Industries added a facility in Phoenix, Arizona and started to concentrate on designing and manufacturing custom units.

In 1992, Bud's son Blair succeeded his father to become the third member of the Haas family to serve as company president. Since that time the company has developed a line of plastic enclosures and a series of NEMA-rated enclosures specially made for harsh environments. In 2015, Josiah Haas succeeded his father as president, leading the company into the 4th generation of family management, a feat achieved by less than 3% of companies. Bud Industries lists over 3,000 standard products on their website.

Bud's "Grand Prix" series steel enclosure housed the first Personal computer, the Kenbak-1.
