= Nanoscale vacuum-channel transistor =

Theoretical transistor

A nanoscale vacuum-channel transistor (NVCT) is a transistor in which the electron transport medium is a vacuum, much like a vacuum tube. In a traditional solid-state transistor, a semiconductor channel exists between the source and the drain, and the current flows through the semiconductor. However, in a nanoscale vacuum-channel transistor, no material exists between the source and the drain, and therefore, the current flows through the vacuum.

Theoretically, a vacuum-channel transistor is expected to operate faster than a traditional solid-state transistor, and have higher power output and lower operation voltage. Moreover, vacuum-channel transistors are expected to operate at higher temperature and radiation level than a traditional transistor making them suitable for space application.

The development of vacuum-channel transistors is still at a very early research stage, and there are only limited study in recent literature such as vertical field-emitter vacuum-channel transistor, gate-insulated planar electrodes vacuum-channel transistor, vertical vacuum-channel transistor, and all-around gate vacuum-channel transistor.

== History ==
The concept of using conventional field-emitted electron beam in a diode was first mentioned in a 1961 article by Kenneth Shoulders. However, due to the technological difficulty of fabricating a field-emitter electron source, such a diode was not implemented.

As the field of microfabrication advanced, it became possible to fabricate field-emitted electron sources, thereby paving the way for vacuum-channel transistors. The first successful implementation was reported by Gary et al. in 1986. However, early vacuum-channel transistors suffered from high gate threshold voltage and couldn't compete with solid-state transistors.

More recent advances in microfabrication have allowed the vacuum-channel length between the source and the drain to be shrunk, thereby significantly reducing the gate threshold voltage below 0.5V, which is comparable to the gate threshold voltage of current solid-state transistors.

As the shrinking of solid-state transistors is reaching its theoretical limit, vacuum-channel transistors may offer an alternative.

== Simplified operation ==
A nanoscale vacuum-channel transistor is essentially a miniaturized version of a vacuum tube. It consists of a field-emitter electron source, a collector electrode, and a gate electrode. The electron source and the collector electrodes are separated by a small distance, usually of the order of several nanometers. When a voltage is applied across the source and the collector electrode, due to field-emission, electrons are emitted from the source electrode, travel through the gap and are collected by the collector electrode. A gate electrode is used to control the current flow through the vacuum-channel.

Despite the name, vacuum-channel transistors do not need to be evacuated. The gap traversed by the electrons is so small that collisions with molecules of gas at atmospheric pressure are infrequent enough not to matter.

== Advantages ==
The nanoscale vacuum-channel transistors have several benefits over traditional solid-state transistors such as high speed, high output power, and operation at high temperature and immunity to strong radiations. The advantages of a vacuum-channel transistor over a solid-state transistor are discussed in detail below:

=== High speed ===
In a solid-state transistor, the electrons collide with the semiconductor lattice and suffer from scattering which slows down the speed of the electrons. In fact, in silicon, the velocity of electrons is limited to 1.4×10^{7} cm/s. However, in vacuum electrons do not suffer from scattering and can reach velocities approaching the speed of light (3×10^{10} cm/s). Therefore, a vacuum-channel transistor can operate at a faster speed than a silicon solid-state transistor.

=== Operation at high temperature ===
The band-gap of silicon is 1.11eV, and the thermal energy of electrons should remain lower than this value for silicon to retain its semiconductor properties. This places a limit on the operating temperature of silicon transistors. However, no such limitation exists in vacuum. Therefore, a vacuum-channel transistor can operate at a much higher temperature, only limited by the melting temperature of the materials used for its fabrication. The vacuum-transistor can be used in applications where a tolerance to high temperature is required.

=== Immunity to radiation ===
The radiation can ionize the atoms in a solid-state transistor. These ionized atoms and corresponding electrons can interfere with the electron transport between the source and collector. However, no ionization occur in the vacuum-channel transistors. Therefore, a vacuum-channel transistor can be used in a high radiation environment such as outer space or inside a nuclear reactor.

== Disadvantage ==
The performance of a vacuum-channel transistor depends upon the field emission of electrons from the source electrode. However, due to the high electric field, the source electrodes degrades over time, thereby decreasing the emission current. Due to the degradation of electrons source electrode, vacuum-channel transistors suffer from poor reliability.
