= Alpha cutoff frequency =

Alpha cutoff frequency, or $f_{\alpha}$ is the frequency at which the common base DC current gain $\alpha$ drops to 0.707 of its low frequency value. The common base DC current gain is the ratio of a transistor's collector current to the transistor's emitter current, or $\alpha = \frac{i_C}{i_E}$.
