= 2N7000 =

Common transistor type

2N7000 / 2N7002
- Component type: MOSFET Transistor
- Working principle: N-channel
- Pin names: G = Gate, D = Drain, S = Source. The symbol doesn't always show the internal diode formed between the substrate and the source/drain/channel.

Electronic symbol

The 2N7000 is housed in a TO92 package, with lead 1 connected as the source, lead 2 as the gate, and lead 3 as the drain. The BS170 has the source and drain leads interchanged.

The 2N7002 variant is packaged in a TO-236 surface-mount package.

The 2N7000 is an N-channel, enhancement-mode MOSFET used for low-power switching applications.

The 2N7000 is a widely available and popular part, often recommended as useful and common components to have around for hobbyist use.

Packaged in a TO-92 enclosure, the 2N7000 is rated to withstand 60 volts and can switch 200 millamps.

== Applications ==
The 2N7000 has been referred to as a "FETlington" and as an "absolutely ideal hacker part." The word "FETlington" is a reference to the Darlington-transistor-like saturation characteristic.

A typical use of these transistors is as a switch for moderate voltages and currents, including as drivers for small lamps, motors, and relays. In switching circuits, these FETs can be used much like bipolar junction transistors, but have some advantages:

- high input impedance of the insulated gate means almost no gate current is required
- consequently no current-limiting resistor is required in the gate input
- MOSFETs, unlike PN junction devices (such as LEDs) can be paralleled because resistance increases with temperature, although the quality of this load balance is largely dependent on the internal chemistry of each individual MOSFET in the circuit

The main disadvantages of these FETs over bipolar transistors in switching are the following:

- susceptibility to cumulative damage from static discharge prior to installation
- circuits with external gate exposure require a protection gate resistor or other static discharge protection
- Non-zero ohmic response when driven to saturation, as compared to a constant junction voltage drop in a bipolar junction transistor

== Other devices ==
The 2N7002 is a surface-mount variant of the 2N7000. The 2N7002K variant integrates protection diodes between the gate and source for electrostatic robustness, and the 2N7002AK-Q additionally is marketed as "automotive qualified" and "logic-level compatible".

Many other n-channel MOSFETs exist. Some part number are BS170, VQ1000J, and VQ1000P. They may have different pin outs, packages, and electrical properties. The BS250P is "a good p-channel analog of the 2N7000."
