= Transistor–transistor logic =

Class of digital circuits

Transistor–transistor logic (TTL) is a logic family built from bipolar junction transistors (BJTs). Its name signifies that transistors perform both the logic function (the first "transistor") and the amplifying function (the second "transistor"), as opposed to earlier resistor–transistor logic (RTL) and diode–transistor logic (DTL).

TTL integrated circuits (ICs) were widely used in applications such as computers, industrial controls, test equipment and instrumentation, consumer electronics, and synthesizers.

After their introduction in integrated circuit form in 1963 by Sylvania Electric Products, TTL integrated circuits were manufactured by several semiconductor companies. The 7400 series by Texas Instruments became particularly popular. TTL manufacturers offered a wide range of logic gates, flip-flops, counters, and other circuits. Variations of the original TTL circuit design offered higher speed or lower power dissipation to allow design optimization. TTL devices were originally made in ceramic and plastic dual in-line package(s) and in flat-pack form. Some TTL chips are now also made in surface-mount technology packages.

TTL became the foundation of computers and other digital electronics. Even after Very-Large-Scale Integration (VLSI) CMOS integrated circuit microprocessors made multiple-chip processors obsolete, TTL devices still found extensive use as glue logic interfacing between more densely integrated components.

== History ==
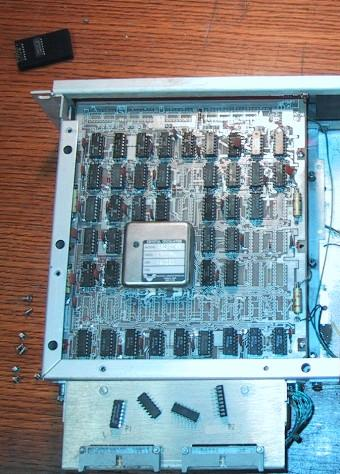
A real-time clock built of TTL chips around 1979

Early transistor-coupled logic circuits were described in 1962 by R. H. Beeson and H. W. Ruegg of Fairchild Semiconductor in “New Forms of All-Transistor Logic,” presented at the IEEE International Solid-State Circuits Conference, where the approach was explicitly referred to as transistor–transistor logic (TTL or T²L). Around the same time, at Pacific Semiconductor (later acquired by TRW), James L. Buie described similar circuits as transistor-coupled transistor logic (TCTL), distinguishing them from diode-coupled transistor logic (DCTL).

As later summarized by the Computer History Museum, these developments occurred in parallel at multiple companies during the early 1960s. In 1962, Gordon Moore, then at Fairchild, referred to this approach as T²L and noted that although it was simple and well suited to integration, it suffered from reduced noise immunity and “current hogging,” limiting fan-in and fan-out; adding the components needed to correct these shortcomings reduced its advantages. Fairchild subsequently pursued diode–transistor logic as its next production family.

By the mid-1960s, a wide variety of logic families were in use, including RTL, RCTL, DCTL, LLL, CML, and DTL, with TTL emerging as an additional family.

Work at Sylvania under Tom Longo refined transistor-coupled logic into a commercially supported family, introduced in 1963 as the Sylvania Universal High-Level Logic (SUHL). Patents for the design were applied for in May and June 1963. The Sylvania parts were used in applications including the controls of the Phoenix missile.

Texas Instruments later standardized and popularized TTL with the 5400 series in 1964 and the 7400 series in 1966. In later oral history, Tom Longo stated that Texas Instruments’ early 54-series implementation closely followed the circuit configuration he had described publicly in 1963, while differentiating its products through relocating the power supply pins to the package corners, together with packaging, cost reduction, and manufacturing scale. The Texas Instruments 7400 family became a de facto industry standard. Compatible parts were manufactured by numerous semiconductor companies, including Motorola, AMD, Fairchild, Intel, National Semiconductor, Signetics, Siemens, and others, including manufacturers in the Eastern Bloc (Soviet Union, GDR, Poland, Czechoslovakia, Hungary, and Romania). In addition to bipolar implementations, compatible 7400-series parts were later produced using other circuit technologies. At least one major manufacturer, IBM, produced non-compatible TTL circuits for internal use; IBM employed TTL technology in systems such as the IBM System/38, IBM 4300, and IBM 3081.

The term "TTL" is applied to many successive generations of bipolar logic, with gradual improvements in speed and power consumption over about two decades. The most recently introduced family 74Fxx is still sold today (as of 2019), and was widely used into the late 90s. 74AS/ALS Advanced Schottky was introduced in 1985. As of 2008, Texas Instruments continues to supply the more general-purpose chips in numerous obsolete technology families, albeit at increased prices. Typically, TTL chips integrate no more than a few hundred transistors each. Functions within a single package generally range from a few logic gates to a microprocessor bit-slice. TTL also became important because its low cost made digital techniques economically practical for tasks previously done by analog methods.

The Kenbak-1, ancestor of the first personal computers, used TTL for its CPU instead of a microprocessor chip, which was not available in 1971. The Datapoint 2200 from 1970 used TTL components for its CPU and was the basis for the 8008 and later the x86 instruction set. The 1973 Xerox Alto and 1981 Star workstations, which introduced the graphical user interface, used TTL circuits integrated at the level of arithmetic logic units (ALUs) and bitslices, respectively. Most computers used TTL-compatible "glue logic" between larger chips well into the 1990s. Until the advent of programmable logic, discrete bipolar logic was used to prototype and emulate microarchitectures under development.

== Implementation ==
=== Fundamental TTL gate ===
Two-input TTL NAND gate with a simple output stage (simplified)

The basic TTL gate is a NAND structure implemented with a multiple-emitter input transistor followed by one or more amplifying stages. In a two-input TTL NAND gate, each input corresponds to one emitter of the multiple-emitter transistor VT1. The output is taken from the collector of the following transistor VT2.

All inputs high (logical 1). When both inputs are high, the emitter–base junctions of VT1 are reverse-biased. VT1 operates in its reverse-active mode. The bias resistor supplies current into the base of VT1; because the reverse current gain of VT1 is small, little current flows through its emitters. Consequently, the base current of VT1 flows almost entirely out through its collector. This collector current becomes the base current of VT2, driving VT2 into conduction and forcing the output low (logical 0).

One input low (logical 0). If either input is driven low, the corresponding emitter–base junction of VT1 becomes forward-biased. VT1 then operates in its normal active mode, and base current is diverted through the low input rather than through the collector. With little or no collector current available to drive VT2, transistor VT2 turns off and the output rises to a high level (logical 1).

Unlike diode–transistor logic (DTL), where the input network consists only of diodes, the TTL input transistor VT1 actively participates in switching. During transitions, VT1 can remove stored charge from VT2, reducing storage time and contributing to the higher switching speed of TTL compared with DTL.

The main disadvantage of TTL with a simple output stage is the relatively high output resistance at output logical "1" that is completely determined by the output collector resistor. It limits the number of inputs that can be connected (the fanout). Some advantage of the simple output stage is the high voltage level (up to V_{CC}) of the output logical "1" when the output is not loaded.

=== Open collector wired logic ===
A common variation omits the collector resistor of the output transistor, making an open-collector output. This allows the designer to fabricate wired logic by connecting the open-collector outputs of several logic gates together and providing a single external pull-up resistor. If any of the logic gates becomes logic low (transistor conducting), the combined output will be low. Examples of this type of gate are the 7401 and 7403 series. Open-collector outputs of some gates have a higher maximum voltage, such as 15 V for the 7426, useful when driving non-TTL loads.

A TTL and-or-invert gate with totem-pole output

=== And-Or-Invert (AOI) implementation in TTL (7450 example) ===
TTL families also include complex gates implemented directly in transistor form rather than by cascading simpler gates. An example is the 7450 dual 2-wide, 2-input AND-OR-INVERT (AOI) gate. Each product term is formed by a multiple-emitter input transistor. In the 7450, one transistor implements the term A·B and another implements C·D. Each drives its own phase-splitter transistor. The collectors of the phase-splitter transistors are connected together, and their emitters are likewise connected together. These shared nodes perform the OR function: if either product term is asserted, the corresponding phase splitter conducts and forces the shared nodes to switch state. The output stage inverts this result, yielding

$X=\overline{(A B + C D)}$

Structures of this type are fundamental in digital logic design because many combinational functions are naturally expressed as sums of products. Implementing the AND-OR-INVERT function directly reduces gate count and propagation delay compared with cascading separate NAND and NOR stages, and such complex gates became common building blocks in MSI logic families.

=== Totem-pole output stage ===
In standard TTL families, the phase-splitter stage drives a totem-pole (push–pull) output consisting of an active pull-down transistor and an emitter-follower pull-up transistor, together with a steering diode that limits simultaneous conduction during switching. When the pull-down transistor is driven into saturation, the output is low. When it is cut off, the upper transistor operates as an emitter follower, producing the high output level at low impedance. The diode D1 and series resistor R4 limit transient current during switching and reduce shoot-through current between the supply rails.

A disadvantage of the "totem-pole" output stage is the decreased voltage level (typically 3.5 V) of the output logical "1" (even if the output is unloaded). The reasons for this reduction are the voltage drops across the Q5 base–emitter and D1 anode–cathode junctions.

== Interfacing considerations ==
Like DTL, TTL is a current-sinking logic since a current must be drawn from inputs to bring them to a logic 0 voltage level. The driving stage must absorb up to 1.6 mA from a standard TTL input while not allowing the voltage to rise to more than 0.4 volts. The output stage of the most common TTL gates is specified to function correctly when driving up to 10 standard input stages (a fanout of 10). TTL inputs are sometimes simply left floating to provide a logical "1", though this usage is not recommended.

Standard TTL circuits operate with a 5-volt power supply. A TTL input signal is defined as "low" when between 0 V and 0.8 V with respect to the ground terminal, and "high" when between 2 V and V_{CC} (5 V), and if a voltage signal ranging between 0.8 V and 2.0 V is sent into the input of a TTL gate, there is no certain response from the gate and therefore it is considered "uncertain" (precise logic levels vary slightly between sub-types and by temperature). TTL outputs are typically restricted to narrower limits of between 0.0 V and 0.4 V for a "low" and between 2.4 V and V_{CC} for a "high", providing at least 0.4 V of noise immunity. Standardization of the TTL levels is so ubiquitous that complex circuit boards often contain TTL chips made by many different manufacturers selected for availability and cost, compatibility being assured. Two circuit board units off the same assembly line on different successive days or weeks might have a different mix of brands of chips in the same positions on the board; repair is possible with chips manufactured years later than original components. Within usefully broad limits, logic gates can be treated as ideal Boolean devices without concern for electrical limitations. The 0.4 V noise margins are adequate because of the low output impedance of the driver stage, that is, a large amount of noise power superimposed on the output is needed to drive an input into an undefined region.

In some cases (e.g., when the output of a TTL logic gate needs to be used for driving the input of a CMOS gate), the voltage level of the "totem-pole" output stage at output logical "1" can be increased closer to V_{CC} by connecting an external resistor between the V4 collector and the positive rail. It pulls up the V_{5} cathode and cuts-off the diode. However, this technique actually converts the sophisticated "totem-pole" output into a simple output stage having significant output resistance when driving a high level (determined by the external resistor).

== Packaging ==
Like most integrated circuits of the period 1963–1990, commercial TTL devices are usually packaged in dual in-line packages (DIPs), usually with 14 to 24 pins, for through-hole or socket mounting. Epoxy plastic (PDIP) packages were often used for commercial temperature range components, while ceramic packages (CDIP) were used for military temperature range parts.

Beam-lead chip dies without packages were made for assembly into larger arrays as hybrid integrated circuits. Parts for military and aerospace applications were packaged in flatpacks, a form of surface-mount package, with leads suitable for welding or soldering to printed circuit boards. Today, many TTL-compatible devices are available in surface-mount packages, which are available in a wider array of types than through-hole packages.

TTL is particularly well suited to bipolar integrated circuits because additional inputs to a gate merely required additional emitters on a shared base region of the input transistor. If individually packaged transistors were used, the cost of all the transistors would discourage one from using such an input structure. But in an integrated circuit, the additional emitters for extra gate inputs add only a small area.

At least one computer manufacturer, IBM, built its own flip chip integrated circuits with TTL; these chips were mounted on ceramic multi-chip modules.

== Comparison with other logic families ==
TTL devices consume substantially more power than equivalent CMOS devices at rest, but power consumption does not increase with clock speed as rapidly as for CMOS devices. Compared to contemporary ECL circuits, TTL uses less power and has easier design rules but is substantially slower. Designers can combine ECL and TTL devices in the same system to achieve best overall performance and economy, but level-shifting devices are required between the two logic families. TTL is less sensitive to damage from electrostatic discharge than early CMOS devices.

Due to the output structure of TTL devices, the output impedance is asymmetrical between the high and low state, making them unsuitable for driving transmission lines. This drawback is usually overcome by buffering the outputs with special line-driver devices where signals need to be sent through cables. ECL, by virtue of its symmetric low-impedance output structure, does not have this drawback.

The TTL "totem-pole" output structure often has a momentary overlap when both the upper and lower transistors are conducting, resulting in a substantial pulse of current drawn from the power supply. These pulses can couple in unexpected ways between multiple integrated circuit packages, resulting in reduced noise margin and lower performance. TTL systems usually have a decoupling capacitor for every one or two IC packages, so that a current pulse from one TTL chip does not momentarily reduce the supply voltage to another.

Since the mid 1980s, several manufacturers supply CMOS logic equivalents with TTL-compatible input and output levels, usually bearing part numbers similar to the equivalent TTL component and with the same pinouts. For example, the 74HCT00 series provides many drop-in replacements for bipolar 7400 series parts, but uses CMOS technology. (The "T" in "HCT" stands for "TTL-compatible". The related 74HC00 series also uses CMOS technology but is not TTL-compatible.)

== Sub-types ==
Successive generations of technology produced compatible parts with improved power consumption or switching speed, or both. Although vendors uniformly marketed these various product lines as TTL with Schottky diodes, some of the underlying circuits, such as used in the LS family, could rather be considered DTL.

Variations of and successors to the basic TTL family, which has a typical gate propagation delay of 10ns and a power dissipation of 10 mW per gate, for a power–delay product (PDP) or switching energy of about 100 pJ, include:

- Low-power TTL (L), which traded switching speed (33ns) for a reduction in power consumption (1 mW) (now essentially replaced by CMOS logic)
- High-speed TTL (H), with faster switching than standard TTL (6ns) but significantly higher power dissipation (22 mW)
- Schottky TTL (S), introduced in 1969, which used Schottky diode clamps at gate inputs to prevent charge storage and improve switching time. These gates operated more quickly (3ns) but had higher power dissipation (19 mW)
- Low-power Schottky TTL (LS) – used the higher resistance values of low-power TTL and the Schottky diodes to provide a good combination of speed (9.5 ns) and reduced power consumption (2 mW), and PDP of about 20 pJ. Probably the most common type of TTL, these were used as glue logic in microcomputers, essentially replacing the former H, L, and S sub-families.
- Fast (F) and Advanced-Schottky (AS) variants of LS from Fairchild and TI, respectively, circa 1985, with "Miller-killer" circuits to speed up the low-to-high transition. These families achieved PDPs of 10 pJ and 4 pJ, respectively, the lowest of all the TTL families.
- Low-voltage TTL (LVTTL) for 3.3-volt power supplies and memory interfacing, a voltage level compatible with LVCMOS.

Most manufacturers offer commercial and extended temperature ranges: for example Texas Instruments 7400 series parts are rated from 0 to 70 °C, and 5400 series devices over the military-specification temperature range of −55 to +125 °C.

Special quality levels and high-reliability parts are available for military and aerospace applications.

Radiation-hardened devices (for example from the SNJ54 series) are offered for space applications.

== Applications ==
Before the advent of VLSI devices, TTL integrated circuits were a standard method of construction for the processors of minicomputer and midrange mainframe computers, such as the DEC VAX and Data General Eclipse; however some computer families were based on proprietary components (e.g. Fairchild CTL) while supercomputers and high-end mainframes used emitter-coupled logic. They were also used for equipment such as machine tool numerical controls, printers and video display terminals, and as microprocessors became more functional for "glue logic" applications, such as address decoders and bus drivers, which tie together the function blocks realized in VLSI elements. The Gigatron TTL is a more recent (2018) example of a processor built entirely with TTL integrated circuits.

=== Analog applications ===
While originally designed to handle logic-level digital signals, a TTL inverter can be biased as an analog amplifier. Connecting a resistor between the output and the input biases the TTL element as a negative feedback amplifier. Such amplifiers may be useful to convert analog signals to the digital domain but would not ordinarily be used where analog amplification is the primary purpose. TTL inverters can also be used in crystal oscillators where their analog amplification ability is significant.

A TTL gate may operate inadvertently as an analog amplifier if the input is connected to a slowly changing input signal that traverses the unspecified region from 0.8 V to 2 V. The output can be erratic when the input is in this range. A slowly changing input like this can also cause excess power dissipation in the output circuit. If such an analog input must be used, there are specialized TTL parts with Schmitt trigger inputs available that will reliably convert the analog input to a digital value, effectively operating as a one bit A to D converter.

=== Serial signaling ===
TTL serial refers to single-ended serial communication using raw transistor voltage levels: "low" for 0 and "high" for 1. UART over TTL serial is a common debug interface for embedded devices. Handheld devices such as graphing calculators and NMEA 0183-compliant GPS receivers and fishfinders also commonly use UART with TTL. TTL serial is only a de facto standard: there are no strict electrical guidelines. Driver–receiver modules interface between TTL and longer-range serial standards: one example is the MAX232, which converts from and to RS-232.

Differential TTL is TTL serial carried over a differential pair with complement levels, providing much enhanced noise tolerance. Both RS-422 and RS-485 signals can be produced using TTL levels.

ccTalk is based on TTL voltage levels.

== See also ==
- Resistor–transistor logic (RTL)
- List of 7400 series integrated circuits
