= Datapoint =

Computer company

Datapoint Corporation
- Type: Private
- Industry: Computing services, Systems integration
- Founded: July 1968
- Founder: John Phil Ray, Gus Roche in San Antonio, Texas
- Defunct: May 3, 2000 (Bankruptcy)
- Fate: Taken over by Asher B. Edelman, and broken up between 1984 - 2000
- Successor: Datapoint Corporation; Dynacore Holdings Corporation; Datapoint U.S.A., Inc.
- Headquarters: Brentford, United Kingdom
- Area served: Europe
- Key people: Victor Poor

Datapoint Corporation, originally known as Computer Terminal Corporation (CTC), was a computer company based in San Antonio, Texas, United States. Founded in July 1968 by Phil Ray and Gus Roche, its first products were, as the company's original name suggests, computer terminals intended to replace Teletype machines connected to time sharing systems.

== Background ==
From the mid-1960s, engineers (John) Phil Ray and Austin O. "Gus" Roche were working for General Dynamics Dynatronic Division in Florida, as part of a computing contract team for NASA working on the Apollo programme. At the time, mainframe computers were large room-filling pieces of equipment, from which data was output using noisy and slow Teletype terminals. On the advice of one of his tutors from the University of Texas, Ray and Roche decided to develop a quieter and smaller input device based on using a television set screen.

== Early history ==
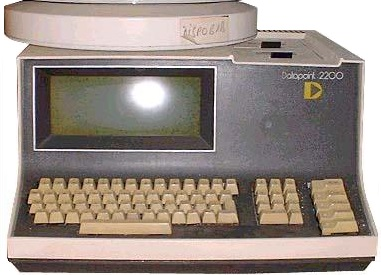
Datapoint 2200

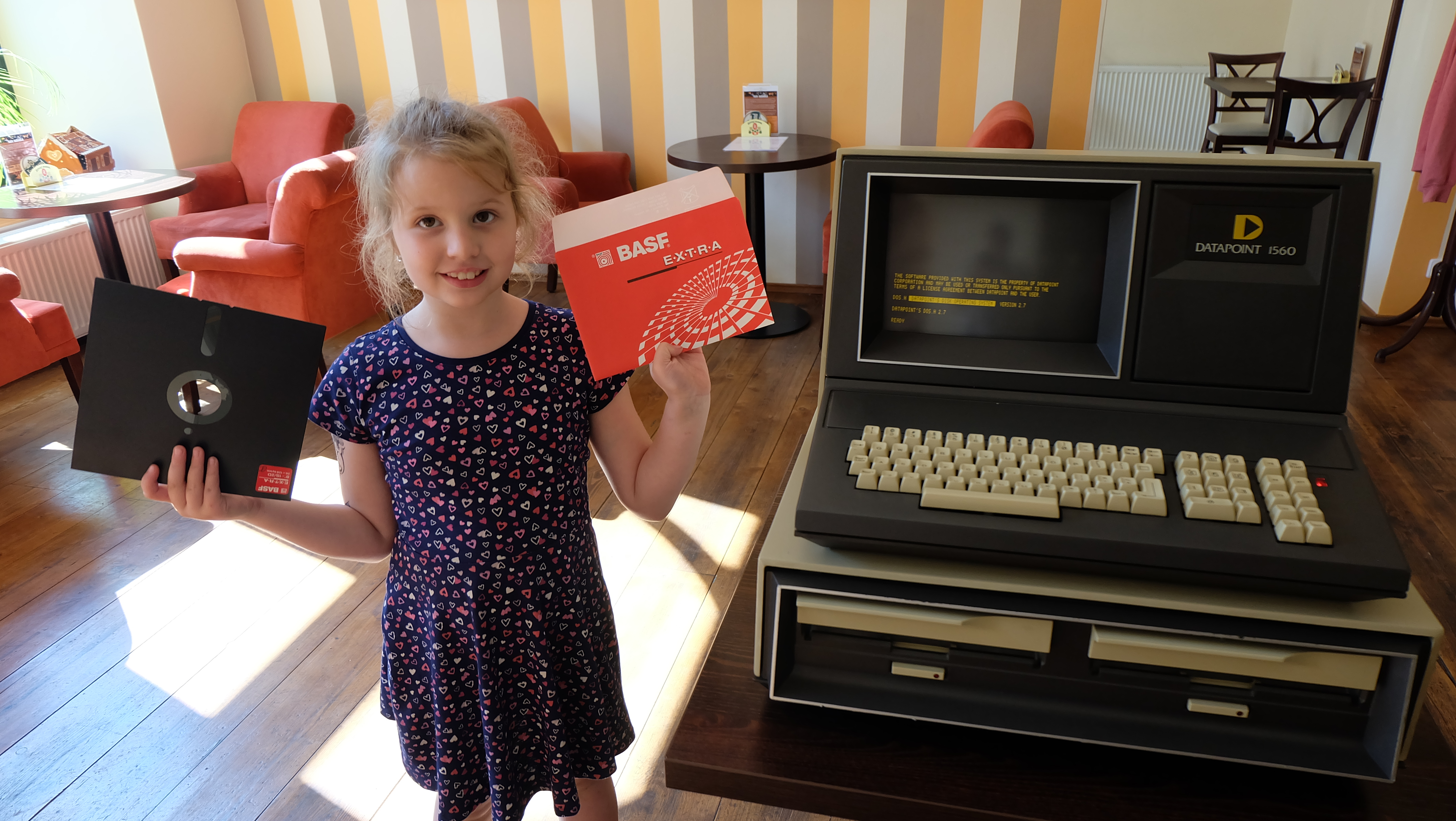
Datapoint 1560 with 2x 8" floppy drive

After finding San Antonio, Texas based backers, the pair incorporated Computer Terminal Corporation (CTC) there in July 1968. Based on a newly developed Texas Instruments chip, with a casing designed by an industrial designer in New York City, the company had developed three prototype Datapoint 3300 (deriving the name from the popular Teletype Model 33 teleprinter), it was an immediate hit at that year's computer show.

However, the resultant orders left the company with several major problems: they had no production capacity, and no money with which to build a factory. In October 1969, the company raised US$4 million through an initial public offering (IPO). This enabled them to outsource production short term to a series of local manufacturers, including a motorcycle helmet manufacturer, before constructing their own manufacturing premises. Once in production, they began sourcing chips from both TI and Intel, running up large debts from both.

The Datapoint 3300 sold very successfully for a number of years. It was later rebadged as the DEC VT06 and the HP 2600A.

== Datapoint 2200 and the Intel 8008 ==
Having raised $4 million in an IPO in August 1969, selling over the counter for $8, by August 1970 the shares were selling at $45.

Ray and Roche wanted to develop a new, more intelligent terminal, and employed a trio of engineers who knew each other from their interests in amateur radio: Victor Poor, Harry Pyle and undergraduate Jonathan Schmidt. The company began development on the Datapoint 2200, its most popular product and credited by some historians as the invention of the personal computer.

While working his notice from Maryland-based Frederick Electronics during the 1969 Thanksgiving holiday, Poor and Pyle developed the underlying instruction set architecture of the processor on a living room floor. This enabled Phil Ray and Gus Roche to design and develop the mass-produced programmable 2200, which could load various emulations stored on cassette tapes. Some users of the terminals chose to use them as simple programmable computers instead.

The original 2200 processor board was a serial design using standard TTL and Intel shift registers for memory.

In December 1969 Poor joined CTC as Technical Director, employing Pyle within his team and sponsoring Schmidt through his degree.

CTC did not believe it could meet its design goals for the CPU built from discrete TTL chips. Ray and Roche asked how much of their design could fit onto a microprocessor chip. Poor and Pyle developed a project that would cost $100,000 to place their architecture onto silicon and into production.

The result was the development of the Intel 8008 microprocessor by Ted Hoff and Stan Mazor of Intel. This design was rejected by Datapoint management, when the demonstration version was not performant and Intel could not meet Datapoint's product launch date. Consequently, the 2200 was released using the conventional SSI/MSI chip technology of the time. Datapoint continued to produce processors that went into the Datapoint 6600 around 1982 and later series.

Thus, today's overwhelmingly dominant instruction set architecture, used in Intel's x86 family of processors as well as all compatible CPUs from AMD and others, traces its ancestry directly back to CTC. The 2200 had an optional disk drive using Shugart 8" floppies, single-sided, single-density, and was the first commercial computer to include them.

The Datapoint 2200 became so popular that CTC later changed its name to Datapoint Corp.

At this time the 2200 processor also had access to an ARCNET card, contributed to by Victor Poor, now working for Datapoint. This was the first commercial local area network (LAN) card, with over ten thousand ARCNET LAN installations in use around the world. The ARCNET card in each 2200 allowed 2200's running a program to access LAN-connected 2200s with attached storage (disk) or printers. This was the first true Distributed Processing over a LAN, as used in Australian Cotton (AusCot Syd), Commodities Trading Sydney, KPMG Sydney and many other small to medium-sized businesses. The LAN was later duplicated by IBM, Banyan, Novell and others using variants of media or methodology. In response, Datapoint offered the Token Ring LAN capability to Tandy for its TRS-80, but ARCNET never really gained any foothold again. They then asked Schmidt to write the accompanying communications software.

== Boom period: 1973-1980 ==
Despite the success of the 2200, the company lacked the finances and skills to manage its own production, and was hence quickly running out of cash. After Ray and Roche investigated and then dismissed selling the company, they agreed to a deal to gain an investment from TRW. However, after realising that his company would be competing with major customer IBM, the President of TRW pulled out of the deal, and renegotiated it as the purchase of overseas manufacturing rights. Combined with other institutional share sales, this raised the required $7M to finance the development of a new product.

However, on investigative audit the new investors found that Datapoint's corporate accounts hid various holes and challenges. After forcing the resignation of the company's first chairman, San Antonio insurance salesman Gerald Mazur, they appointed Harold O'Kelley, who had an engineering background and had been a vice-president of the electronics firm Harris Corporation, and formally renamed the firm Datapoint.

O'Kelley immediately realised that the TRW deal was fatally flawed. Effectively, it allowed TRW to manufacture outside North America, but then import the product and sell directly against Datapoint in North America. After renegotiations, O'Kelley and TRW agreed a new contract which allowed TRW to market the product outside North America, but not to manufacture it. He then raised an additional $8 million via a third Wall Street-backed public offering, with a plan to raise sales from $18M to $100M within five years. As a result, under the chairmanship of O'Kelley, between 1973 and 1981, revenues grew at a 40% pace, with sales surpassing $100M in 1977, reaching $450M by 1981.

This growth was only enabled through the development of various products through the partnership between Ray, Roche, Poor and Pyle. These included Datashare, a concept that allowed many terminals to communicate with each other independent of a mainframe. In 1976, Datapoint introduced a machine that automatically routed outgoing telephone calls onto the cheapest available line, there by liberalising the US Telecoms market after the AT&T breakup. It then introduced telephone directory software and word processing programs, as well as electronic mail functions.

Datapoint acquired pioneering hard disk drive manufacturer Data Disc in March 1977 for $2 million.

Other Datapoint inventions were ARCnet, invented in 1977, originally called ARC (Attached Resource Computer), which was an early token-passing local area network (LAN) protocol, and the PL/B high-level programming language, which was originally called Databus (from Datapoint business language) and ran under the Datashare multi-user interpreter. Later developments included a Mapped Intelligent Disc System (MIDS) which networked 2200 series terminals to a single mass storage disc operating system and enhanced Distributed Data Processing. Proprietary operating systems included DOS and RMS (Resource Management System). RMS was introduced alongside the 8800 processor in 1980, supporting controlled access to networked resources and the scaling of applications across processors. Datapoint later moved its hardware to be based on Intel 386 CPUs.

ARCnet was briefly superseded by ARCnetplus, which provided throughput of 20 Mbit/s and include options such as LiteLink which used infra-red technology to link systems in adjacent buildings. This was launched around the time 100 Mbit/s Ethernet arrived so never really took much market share, even though ARCnet used simple, slender co-axial cable, not Ethernet's thick yellow cable, and despite having a slower transmission-speed had superior throughput, and was much simpler to configure and operate (servers could be connected and disconnected without taking the network down or reconfiguring).

Datapoint also developed and patented one of the earliest picture-in-picture implementations of videoconferencing called MINX (Multimedia Information Network eXchange). It was also part of the first video visitation and arraignment systems. It has been suggested it made more money from lawsuits over patent infringements than through sales of the product. MINX could be used with conventional IBM-compatible PCs or with Datapoint's own VISTA-PC. The VISTA-PC was offered in a range of models with accompanying peripherals, employing the Intel 80186 processor and running MS-DOS. Emulating the Datapoint 8220 workstation and operating in a Resource Management System (RMS) environment, the VISTA-PC could run Datapoint's PRO-VISTA office automation suite, integrating it with MINX.

Datapoint sought to expand in the Unix market, originally partnering with Charles River Data Systems in 1984. A renewed effort was initiated in 1988 through a three-year agreement with Norsk Computer Industri (NCI), a small Norwegian-based company, to supply multiprocessor systems based on the Motorola 68020 and 68030 CPUs. NCI's products were introduced as the SX100, 200 and 300, acting as Unix servers on ARCnet local area networks. Datapoint also demonstrated its DX200 video server at a Uniforum event in early 1988. However, this agreement was reportedly terminated in June 1989 after Olivetti, a competitor, acquired control of Scanvest Ring, a significant shareholder in NCI. Datapoint replaced the NCI models with a new range of DX models based on the 68030 CPU and VMEbus.

== Decline: 1980-1984 ==
By the early 1980s, Datapoint ranked as a Fortune 500 company. Lead times were extending rapidly as demand for Datapoint products increased, leading to delivery delays and unhappy customers. Pressure to increase sales led to some questionable orders being accepted. Compounding this, many of the orders were simply placed to guarantee availability of the product at a future point when it was expected that actual orders would be in place. When these actual orders never materialized, the excess capacity and inventories initiated a financial collapse. Additionally, some of the actual customers went broke before paying their bills due to the general business slowdown. Such factors forced Datapoint to reverse sales or to record substantial bad debts, which caused the company to lose $800 million of its market capitalization in a matter of a few months in early 1982. The U.S. Securities and Exchange Commission (SEC) ordered Datapoint to stop this practice.

After cancelling the ground breaking ceremony in a new headquarters building in March 1982, the factory in Waco, Texas, closed in early 1982, and all Waco production transferred to the newer Fort Worth factory. The Ft. Worth Factory closed in 1985 as the company continued in a virtual free-fall, leaving the San Antonio factory (aka "9725") as the sole remaining factory in the US. Production shrank further and several San Antonio facilities were consolidated, with much factory space in 9725 being converted to offices to allow termination of office leases in the area. While numerous factory personnel moved from Waco to Ft. Worth, very few relocated from Ft. Worth to San Antonio, as the company was shrinking in size rapidly.

== Edelman takeover ==
In December 1984, corporate raider Asher B. Edelman revealed that he had built up an 8% holding in Datapoint. In the same month Edelman offered $23 a share, or $416.3 million, to acquire the company. Datapoint's board rejected the offer but began inviting takeover proposals from other interested parties. Edelman then withdrew his bid, and began directly seeking shareholders' consent to oust Datapoint's board, replace them with his own designees and then sell the company to a third party or parties; his business takeover pattern deployed in other companies. Datapoint's board resultantly changed the company's bylaws to make the consent solicitation more difficult, a change Edelman later successfully blocked in court. In February 1985, Datapoint reported its predicted increased loss for the last quarter 1984, of $15.9 million. After a three-month fight, on March 16 the board of Datapoint agreed to restructure the company, led by the immediate resignation of O'Kelley and his replacement as chairman by Edelman, who dropped his legal challenges.

== Divestiture ==
After the Edelman takeover, Datapoint spun off its service division into Intelogic Trace, Inc., which initially specialized in servicing Datapoint equipment but later broadened into supporting products from other vendors as well. Intelogic Trace declared Chapter 11 bankruptcy, and on April 6, 1995, its assets were sold to Decision Servcom, a company in Pennsylvania.

Datapoint itself weathered a subsequent battle for control of the company that triggered more attention from the SEC. In December 1999, all of Datapoint's patented video communications technologies, along with all inventory and assets associated with the video business group was sold to one of its resellers, VUGATE. A handful of the loyal video group employees went to work for this company which was still selling the product as of 2021.

On May 3, 2000, Datapoint filed for Chapter 11 bankruptcy, and was broken up:

- Datapoint UK Limited - on June 19, the company sold the Datapoint name and various operations to its European subsidiary for $49.3 million. The company changed its emphasis to call center equipment and largely pulled out of the computer market. Purchased by Alchemy Partners, in 2007 it acquired the assets of Touchbases' Avaya business to expand its footprint and extend into enterprise communications. Headquartered in Brentford, England, it has clients on 5,000 sites in 41 countries.
- Dynacore Holdings Corporation - on June 19, 2000, the remnant of Datapoint's US operations changed its name to Dynacore Holdings Corporation and formed a subsidiary that pursued 14 lawsuits based on two patents granted to Datapoint regarding local area networks. With only $1.3 million left from the sale of its European operations after paying its debts and no products left to sell — its total revenues for the first half of 2001 dwindled to $9,000 and a year later fell to nothing — Dynacore searched for a company to buy. In February 2003, Dynacore engaged in a reverse takeover of The CattleSale Company. Asher Edelman now sits in CattleSale's board of directors.
- Datapoint U.S.A., Inc. - in April 2003, Datapoint U.S.A., Inc. assumed control of all RMS Operating System based products from Datapoint Group(UK). Datapoint U.S.A., Inc. is based in San Antonio, TX and continues to provide RMS development, maintenance and support services to users worldwide. An office building and street in San Antonio still bear Datapoint's name, but is not associated with the residual US company.
