= John Murphy (engineer) =

American inventor and computer engineer

- Born: John Anthony Murphy; 1943 (age 82–83); Tulsa, Oklahoma, U.S.
- Education: University of Notre Dame
- Occupations: Inventor, Engineer, Computer Scientist
- Employer(s): Datapoint, Telex, Performance Technologies
- Known for: Developer of ARCNET, the first commercial local area network

John A. Murphy is an American inventor and computer engineer credited with inventing ARCNET, the first commercial networking system, in 1976. He was working for Datapoint Corporation at the time. His biography appeared in the IT History Society website.

== Background and career ==
Originally from Tulsa, Oklahoma, Murphy graduated from the University of Notre Dame in 1965 with a B.S. degree in electrical engineering. He first worked at IBM, then Motorola, Telex, and Singer Business Machines before joining Datapoint, where he led design of the computer networking system ARCNET. Victor Poor had established the R&D function at Datapoint as industry leading: with Harry Pyle, Poor co-created the architecture that was ultimately implemented in the first successful computer microprocessor, the Intel 8008.

=== ARCNET ===
Developed in 1976, ARCNET (Attached Resource Computer NETwork) was the first widely available networking system for microcomputers.

Datapoint had pioneered microprocessors; the challenge ARCNET addressed was how to facilitate the efficient transmission of information between different machines. In an interview with Len Shustek for the Computer History Museum, Murphy notes that Datapoint took ARCNET from concept to reality in "under a year and probably very much under a year." As the first commercial local area network, ARCNET found early success, but corporate struggles at Datapoint led to slower adoption in the 1980s, relative to other commercial alternatives like Ethernet. According to Techopedia, "ARCnet was the first simple networking based solution that provided for all kinds of transmission regardless of the transmission medium or the type of computer."
