= Token bus network =

Implementation of Token Ring using a virtual ring on a coaxial cable

Token passing in a token bus network

In computer networking, a token bus network is a network implementing a token-passing protocol over a virtual ring on a coaxial cable.

== Network ==
A token is passed around the network nodes and only the node possessing the token may transmit. If a node doesn't have anything to send, the token is passed on to the next node on the virtual ring. Each node must know the address of its neighbour in the ring, so a special protocol is needed to notify the other nodes of connections to, and disconnections from, the ring.

Ethernet's access protocol could not absolutely guarantee a maximum time any station would have to wait to access the network, so was thought to be unsuitable for manufacturing automation applications. The Token bus protocol was created to combine the benefits of a physical bus network with the deterministic access protocol of a Token Ring network.

== IEEE 802.4 ==
Token Bus was standardized by IEEE standard 802.4. It was mainly used for industrial applications. Token Bus was used by General Motors for their Manufacturing Automation Protocol (MAP) standardization effort. This differs from Token Ring networks in that the endpoints of the bus do not meet to form a physical ring.

In order to guarantee the packet delay and transmission in the Token Bus protocol, a modified Token Bus was proposed in manufacturing automation systems and flexible manufacturing system (FMS). To optimize deterministic access required by real-time IoT communication in a distributed manufacturing plant or IIoT, token bus method can also be implemented according to IEEE 802.15.4.

A means for carrying Internet Protocol over IEEE 802 networks, including token bus networks, was developed.

The IEEE 802.4 Working Group has disbanded and the standard has been withdrawn by the IEEE.

== See also ==
- ARCNET
- Network topology
