= Databus =

Databus may refer to:

- Bus (computing), a communication system that transfers data between different components in a computer or between different computers
  - Memory bus, a bus between the computer and the memory
  - PCI bus, a bus between motherboard and peripherals that uses the Peripheral Component Interconnect standard
  - USB (Universal Serial Bus), a standard communication protocol used by many portable devices, computer peripherals and storage media
- Programming Language for Business, a business-oriented programming language originally called DATABUS
- the Databus project from DBpedia
