= PLB (disambiguation) =

PLB or Personal Locator Beacon is a type of distress radiobeacon.

PLB may also refer to:

- Physics Letters B, a scientific journal covering nuclear physics, Particle physics, and astrophysics.
- Processor Local Bus, a bus used for IBM's PowerPC processors
- Programming Language for Business
- Public light bus, a form of public transport in Hong Kong
- Pursed lip breathing, a breathing technique used in medicine
- Premier League of Belize the highest competitive football league in Belize
- Clinton County Airport's IATA code
- Phospholipase B
- Phospholamban
