= Thomas-Conrad =

Defunct American networking hardware company

Thomas-Conrad Corporation
- Type: Private
- Industry: Computer networking
- Founded: 1985; 41 years ago
- Founders: Walter Thirion; Scott Johnson
- Defunct: 1995; 31 years ago
- Fate: Acquired by Compaq
- Number of employees: 220 (1995)

Thomas-Conrad Corporation was an American computer networking hardware company active from 1985 to 1995 and based in Austin, Texas. From the late 1980s until its acquisition by Compaq in 1995, Thomas-Conrad was a market leader in the field of high-speed networking hardware. It produced hubs, routers, switches, NICs, and other products for networks based on Ethernet, Token Ring, and ARCNET.

== History ==
Thomas-Conrad Corporation was founded by Walter Thomas Thirion and Scott Conrad Johnson in Austin, Texas, in 1985. Before founding the company, Johnson had practiced internal medicine at the Cleveland Clinic in the 1970s, while Thirion had been pursuing a doctorate in nuclear physics. Both had met each other while working for a networking hardware company in the early 1980s. This company went bankrupt and liquidated in around 1984, prompting the duo to found Thomas-Conrad in 1985. The founders derived the name of the company from each of their middle names.

After investing $1,000 into the start-up of Thomas-Conrad, the duo leveraged a pre-existing networking product they had developed to fulfill a client contract at their older employer. The proceeds from this contract was later invested back into the company as capital to develop original hardware. After about a year, the company introduced its first product to the market, which was a commercial success and provided the foundation for the company's later hardware. Within a year or two company hired a secretary as its first employee. Thirion's wife Lorraine was later hired as Thomas-Conrad's bookkeeper; she was eventually promoted to the vice president of marketing and the director of human resources.

By September 1990, the company had between 175 and 200 employees and was the second-largest manufacturer of high-speed local area networking equipment. Its growth was facilitated entirely without venture capital nor private equity, its founders keeping eschewing an IPO in favor of keeping the company private. By 1992, Thomas-Conrad's hardware roster included hubs, routers, switches, NICs, and other products for networks based on Ethernet, Token Ring, and ARCNET. It also developed and marketed a network management software package called the Sectra Network Management System. In June 1990, the company introduced a proprietary token bus network technology called Thomas Conrad Networking System (TCNS) that was marketed as a low-cost alternative to Fiber Distributed Data Interface (FDDI). The company's inaugural TCNS hub had a data transfer rate of 100 MB/s. Newer implementations of TCNS continued to be developed into at least 1994.

The company experienced high executive churn between the fall and summer of 1993, culminating in the hiring of Rod Canion, the co-founder of Compaq, and John Gribi, formerly Compaq's chief financial officer, to Thomas-Conrad's board of directors in June 1993. Canion's position at Thomas-Conrad was his second at a technology company since his widely publicized ouster at Compaq in 1991; following his departure from Compaq, he founded a small technology consulting company in Houston. Following their hiring of these Compaq veterans, Thomas-Conrad began an initiative to ramp up production of Ethernet and Token Ring products to attack the low-end of the high-speed LAN market, primarily aiming to cut into IBM's market share (IBM were the progenitors of Token Ring). As well, the company continued to compete with FDDI's dominance in wide area networks with TCNS.

Employment at Thomas-Conrad peaked at 220 employees in 1995, while monthly output of circuit boards peaked at 100,000 circuit boards in the same year. In the summer of 1995, the company moved from an over 44,000-square-foot office in north Austin to a 150,000-square-foot office closer to the heart of Austin. Around this time, Thomas-Conrad began talks with Compaq that year to supply the latter with networking technology that year. These conversations eventually led Compaq to acquire Thomas-Conrad for an undisclosed amount in October 1995 (this amount rumored to be US$15 million). This was Compaq's first-ever acquisition of an entire company; the company had heretofore depended on joint ventures and co-marketing agreements. Following the acquisition, the Thomas-Conrad name was dropped, and its assets were absorbed into Compaq's networking division.
