= Shift register lookup table =

Shift register lookup table

A shift register lookup table, also shift register LUT or SRL, refers to a component in digital circuitry. It is essentially a shift register of variable length. The length of SRL is set by driving address pins high or low and can be changed dynamically, if necessary.

The SRL component is used in FPGA devices. The SRL can be used as a programmable delay element.

== See also ==
- Lookup table
- Shift register
