= Victor Poor =

American engineer and computer pioneer

- Born: July 12, 1933; Los Angeles, California, U.S.
- Died: August 17, 2012 (aged 79); Palm Bay, Florida, U.S.
- Occupations: Engineer, Inventor
- Years active: 1952–2012
- Employer(s): United States Navy; Stromberg-Carlson; Raytheon; Frederick Electronics; Datapoint; Airnet
- Known for: Co-development of the microprocessor, ARCNET, APlink, Winlink
- Spouse: Florence Ann Poor
- Children: 3
- Call sign: W6JSO/W5SMM
- Awards: ARRL President's Award

Victor "Vic" Poor (July 12, 1933 – August 17, 2012) was an American engineer and computer pioneer. At Computer Terminal Corporation (later renamed Datapoint Corporation), he co-created the architecture that was ultimately implemented in the first successful computer microprocessor, the Intel 8008. Subsequently, Computer Terminal Corporation created the first personal computer, the Datapoint 2200 programmable terminal.

== Early life ==
Victor Dale Poor was born in Los Angeles, California, the son of Pinckney Peyton Poor and Leona Lucille Poor (née Mallory). With a passion for radio, he built his own transceiver from collected discarded pieces, and qualified on amateur radio in 1951 (callsign W6JSO).

After high school, Poor joined the United States Navy. While attending electronics training at the Treasure Island Naval Base in 1952, he met his wife, Florence, in a church in San Francisco. On completing his training the couple married in November 1952, and he was then assigned to Ford Island naval base, Pearl Harbor, Hawaii.

== Career ==
On leaving the Navy in 1955, Poor joined the telecommunications technology team at Stromberg-Carlson in San Diego, California. Trained in computer programming, he wrote his first program in 1956 for the UNIVAC 1103. Recruited by Raytheon, the couple then moved to Massachusetts. Although Poor did not attend college, he took electronics training classes both in the Navy and at Raytheon. A quick learner, he soon knew more than his instructors and began teaching classes himself.

Poor then moved to Maryland to help form radio and telegraph equipment manufacturer Frederick Electronics. Quickly made an executive, he developed the idea of adapting radioteletype (RTTY) machines to send data wirelessly. These were then sold to both the United States Army and later commercial media customers, such as the Associated Press, to send affiliated news reports as data around the world.

=== Computer engineering ===
Poor continued his research and development, trying to develop a method for sending photographs and pictures wirelessly. In 1969 while working his notice period from Frederick Electronics, during the Thanksgiving holiday, Poor and fellow amateur radio colleague Harry Pyle produced the underlying architecture of the modern microprocessor on a living room floor. They then asked fellow radio amateur Jonathan Schmidt to write the accompanying communications software. Pitching the idea to both Texas Instruments and Intel, the partnership developed the Intel 8008, the forerunner of the microprocessor chips found in today's personal and computing devices.

In late 1969, Poor joined start-up computer company Computer Terminal Corporation as Technical Director in San Antonio, Texas. Founded by two former NASA engineers, Phil Ray and Gus Roche, they asked him to approach Intel to see how much of his design could fit onto a computer chip. Pitching a $100,000 proposal to place the architecture onto silicon and into production, the project became the Intel 8008 master chip, the world's first 8-bit microprocessor. Poor and Pyle then developed the instruction set architecture which enabled Ray and Roche to design and develop the mass-produced programmable Datapoint 2200 computer terminal. As a result of the success of this product, the company changed its name to Datapoint. Datapoint remained one generation ahead of Intel until the Intel 80286.

Overseeing the development of ARCNET by lead ARCNET architect John Murphy, an early local area network, Poor stayed with Datapoint until 1984, after they had lost their technical microchip lead to IBM and been bought out by corporate raiders. He "retired" with his wife on the profits that he had made from the 15 year growth in Datapoint stock, deciding to go sailing. After sailing across the Atlantic Ocean, they spent the first summer in the Mediterranean on the 50 foot (15 m) Gulfstar yacht Elsinore, named after the location of the castle in Shakespeare’s "Hamlet".

=== Amateur radio ===
The challenges of communicating by radio while at sea (callsign W5SMM) led Poor to develop software that integrates Internet with amateur radio to store and forward messages; this system is today part of a major amateur-supported emergency communications network. While sailing, Poor wanted a better way to communicate with those around him. This led to him developing, in 1985, the original computer program, APlink (AMTOR-Packet Link). Then as part of a group of radio amateurs, acting as the architect Poor helped to develop what became Winlink. Both of these systems would automatically store and forward messages between amateur radio stations. With no one in the group able to take royalties due to the amateur radio regulations, the American Radio Relay League (ARRL) later adopted APlink for their National Traffic System (NTS) digital messages. The system was widely adopted by radio amateurs, the United States military, and state and local emergency preparedness teams. It was credited with being one of the few communications systems that worked in the wake of Hurricane Katrina.

== Retirement ==
In 1994, Poor was recruited as the President of Airnet, a spinoff from Harris Corporation, based in Melbourne, Florida. Proposing to his wife that they would soon be home in San Antonio, at the end of his 2.5 year tenure they retired to Brevard County, Florida instead.

On December 8, 2004, Gardner Hendrie and Len Shustek of the Computer History Museum in Mountain View, California, recorded "The Oral History of Victor Poor."

Poor's lifelong hobbies were operating amateur radio, flying airplanes, and sailing boats. Poor and his wife Florence loved to sail. Their earliest cruises were out of Corpus Christi, Texas, and included adventures to the Yucatán peninsula. In 1984, the couple sailed their 50-ft sloop Elsinore across the Atlantic Ocean and toured the western Mediterranean Sea; between 1988 and 1990, they lived aboard a 37-ft catamaran Aransas Light and explored the coastlines of the Gulf of Mexico, the Bahamas, and the eastern seaboard as far north as Chesapeake Bay; between 1990 and 1994 they moved to a Diesel-powered 50-ft trawler Excalibur to sightsee along the Inland Waterway between Seattle, Washington, and Skagway, Alaska.

In May 2012, Poor was diagnosed with Stage IV pancreatic cancer. On July 9, Poor was awarded the ARRL President's Award at the Platinum Coast Amateur Radio Society annual meeting, for a lifetime of achievements. There have been only a handful of recipients of this prestigious award.

Poor died early on the morning of August 17, 2012, at William Childs Hospice House in Palm Bay, Florida.
