= Datapoint 3300 =

Computer terminal

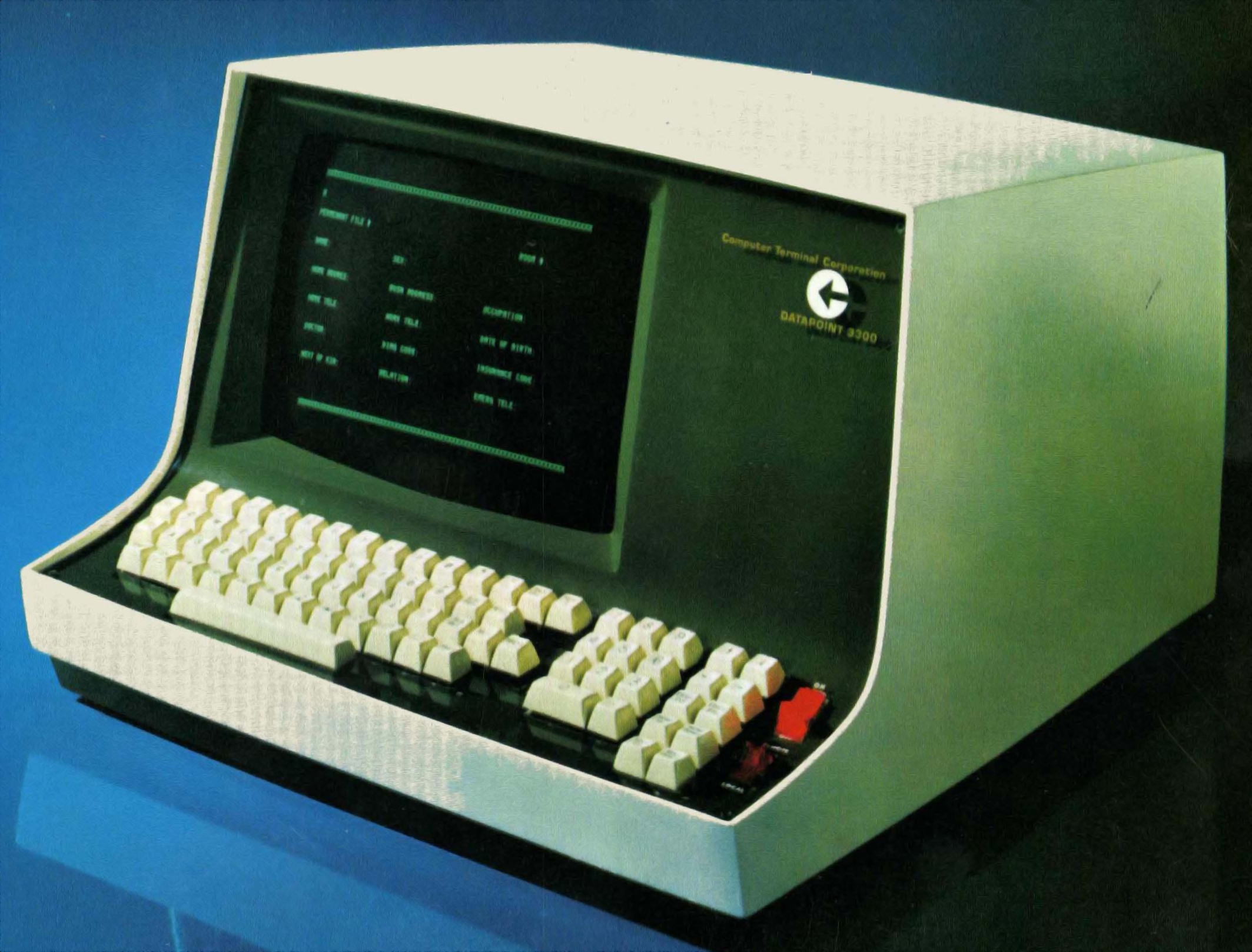
- Promotional image of a Datapoint 3300 terminal
- Also known as: DEC VT06; HP 2600A
- Manufacturer: Datapoint
- Type: Computer terminal
- Released: 1969; 57 years ago

The DataPoint 3300 was the first computer terminal manufactured by Computer Terminal Corporation, later renamed Datapoint, announced in 1967 and shipping in 1969. Since this terminal was intended to replace a teleprinter such as those made by Teletype Corporation it was one of the first glass TTYs (glass for the screen, TTY as the abbreviation for "Teletype") ever produced.

As well as being sold under its own name, it was also sold as the DEC VT06 and the HP 2600A (introduced in 1972).

== Details ==
The Datapoint 3300 emulated a Teletype Model 33, but went beyond what a Teletype could achieve with its paper output. It supported control codes to move the cursor up, down, left and right, to the top left of the screen, or to the start of the bottom line. The 3300 could also clear to the end of the current line, or clear to the end of the screen.

It did not, however, support direct cursor positioning. It also had 25 rows of 72 columns of upper-case characters, rather than the 80 x 24 that would become more common in subsequent years.

== Hardware ==
Like most terminals designed up until the mid-1970s, the Datapoint 3300 was implemented using TTL logic in a typical mix of small-scale and medium-scale integrated circuits, i.e. in a very similar way to how many minicomputers of the 1970/80s (such as the Digital VAX-11) were built. Later terminals (such as the VT100) typically used a microprocessor to implement large parts of the user interface and general logic.

At the time of its introduction, RAM was expensive (it would not be until 1970 that Intel released the 1103, the first DRAM semiconductor memory chip making RAM affordable). Thus, the terminal stored its display of 25 rows of 72 columns of upper-case characters using fifty-four 200-bit shift registers, arranged in six tracks of nine packs each, providing shift register memory for 1800 6-bit characters. The shift-register design meant that scrolling the terminal display could be accomplished by simply pausing the display output to skip one line of characters.

== See also ==
- Datapoint 2200
