= Bobby Hersom =

British mathematician and computer scientist

Bobby Hersom (born 1929 in Cheshire, England) is a British mathematician and computer scientist known for her early work on computers at Elliott Brothers, Hatfield Polytechnic, and the Rothamstead Agricultural Research Station.

== Life ==
Hersom was born Beryl Lewis (not Roberta as in) in Cheshire, England, the oldest of three children. She earned a maths degree from the University of Cambridge in 1950. She then earned a teaching degree in 1951. She was a member of The Round, an English Country Dance Club while at Cambridge.

She married Ed Hersom, who she met through work, in 1954.

Her son Colin also attended Cambridge and was a mathematician and her daughter was a farmer. She regretted having to quit her work as a computer scientist after her first child was born, which meant she could only work freelance.

Her husband died in 2002.

== Career ==
After earning her teaching degree, Hersom worked as a teacher, but realized she didn't enjoy that work.

She started working in the Theory Division at Elliott Brothers in Borehamwood, UK, in 1953. There she wrote software programs for Nicholas, a research computer. Some of the software she developed processed radar data. In 1954, she left that job to start her family.

Hersom then worked for Rothamstead for 11 years. She later worked as a consultant for Hatfield Polytechnic, along with her husband. She worked there until retirement.
