= Token passing =

Channel access method

On a local area network, token passing is a channel access method where a packet called a token is passed between nodes to authorize that node to communicate.

== Channel access method ==
In contrast to polling access methods, there is no pre-defined "master" node. The most well-known examples are IBM Token Ring and ARCNET, but there were a range of others, including FDDI (Fiber Distributed Data Interface), which was popular in the early to mid 1990s.

Token passing schemes degrade deterministically under load, which is a key reason why they were popular for industrial control LANs such as Manufacturing Automation Protocol (MAP). The advantage over contention based channel access (such as the CSMA/CD of early Ethernet), is that collisions are eliminated, and that the channel bandwidth can be fully utilized without idle time when demand is heavy. The disadvantage is that even when demand is light, a station wishing to transmit must wait for the token, increasing latency.

Some types of token passing schemes do not need to explicitly send a token between systems because the process of "passing the token" is implicit. An example is the channel access method used during "Contention Free Time Slots" in the ITU-T G.hn standard for high-speed local area networking using existing home wires (power lines, phone lines and coaxial cable).

== See also ==
- Cambridge Ring
- HP-IL (HP Interface Loop)
- Ring network
