= ARCNET =

LAN communications protocol

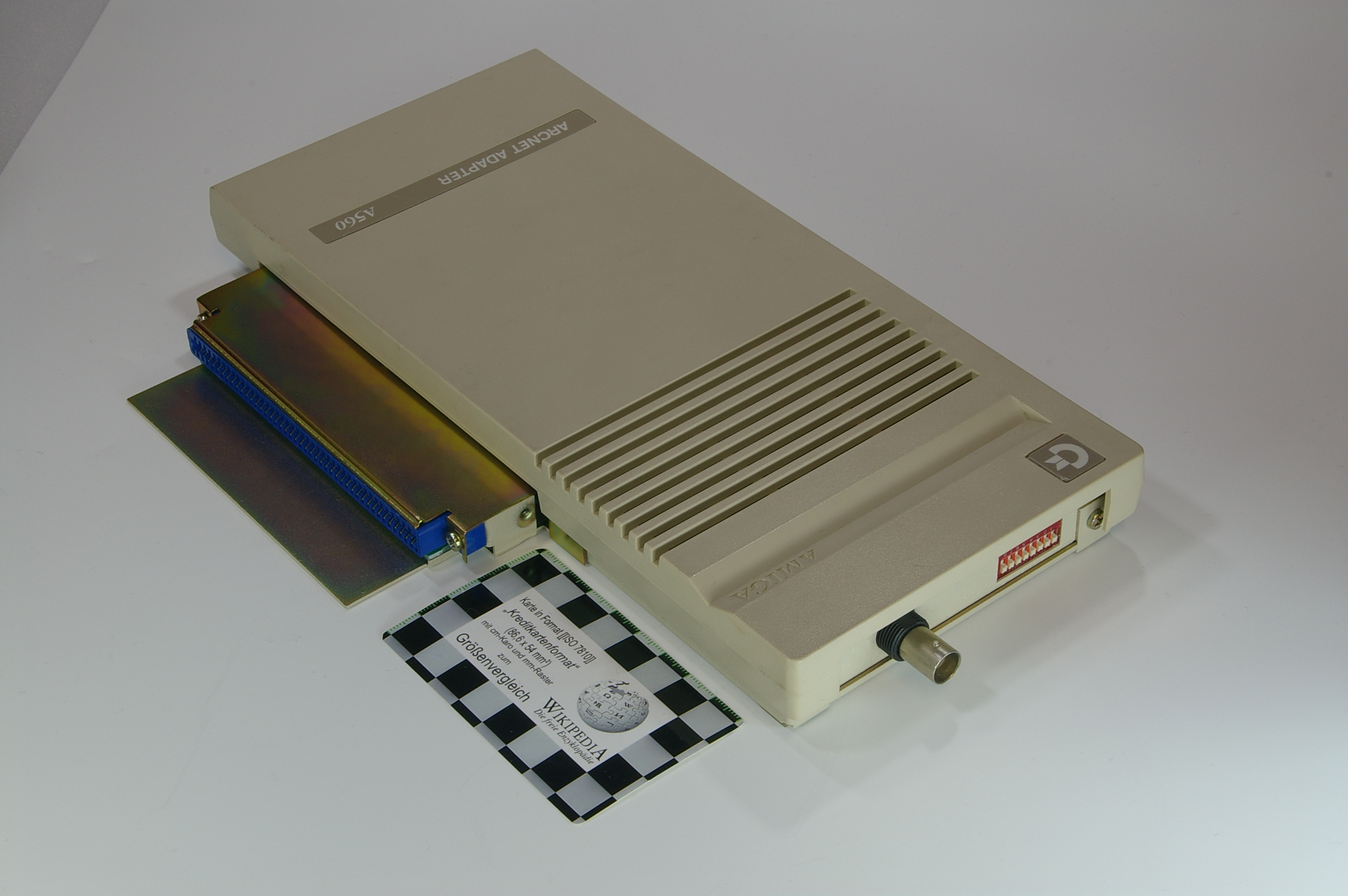
An ARCNET adapter for an Amiga 500 computer. The small card next to it is the size of a credit card.

Attached Resource Computer NETwork (ARCNET or ARCnet) is a communications protocol for local area networks. ARCNET was the first widely available networking system for microcomputers and it became popular in the 1980s for office automation tasks. It was later applied to embedded systems where certain features of the protocol are especially useful.

== History ==
=== Development ===
ARCNET was developed by principal development engineer John Murphy, at Datapoint Corporation in 1976 under Victor Poor, and announced in 1977. It was originally developed to connect groups of their Datapoint 2200 terminals to talk to a shared 8" floppy disk system. It was the first loosely coupled LAN-based clustering system, making no assumptions about the type of computers that would be connected. This was in contrast to contemporary larger and more expensive computer systems such as DECnet or IBM's SNA, where a homogeneous group of similar or proprietary computers were connected as a cluster.

The token-passing bus protocol of that I/O device-sharing network was subsequently applied to allowing processing nodes to communicate with each other for file-serving and computing scalability purposes. An application could be developed in DATABUS, Datapoint's proprietary COBOL-like language, and deployed on a single computer with dumb terminals. When the number of users outgrew the capacity of the original computer, additional 'compute' resource computers could be attached via ARCNET to run the same applications and access the same data. If more storage was needed, additional disk resource computers could also be attached. This incremental approach broke new ground and by the end of the 1970s (before the first IBM PC was announced in 1981), over ten thousand ARCNET LAN installations were in commercial use around the world while Datapoint had become a Fortune 500 company. As microcomputers took over the industry, well-proven and reliable ARCNET was also offered as an inexpensive LAN for these machines.

=== Market ===
ARCNET remained proprietary until the early-to-mid 1980s. This did not cause concern at the time, as most network architectures were proprietary. The move to non-proprietary, open systems began as a response to the dominance of International Business Machines (IBM) and its Systems Network Architecture (SNA). In 1979, the Open Systems Interconnection Reference Model (OSI model) was published. Then, in 1980, Digital, Intel and Xerox (the DIX consortium) published an open standard for Ethernet that was soon adopted as the basis of standardization by the IEEE and the ISO. IBM responded by proposing Token Ring as an alternative to Ethernet but kept such tight control over standardization that competitors were wary of using it. ARCNET was less expensive than either of these, was more reliable, more flexible and, by the late 1980s, had a market share about equal to that of Ethernet. Tandy/Radio Shack offered ARCNET as an application and file sharing medium for their TRS-80 Model II, Model 12, Model 16, Tandy 6000, Tandy 2000, Tandy 1000 and Tandy 1200 computer models. There were also hooks in the Model 4P's ROM to boot from an ARCNET network.

Ethernet became much more attractive when it moved from co-axial cable to twisted pair and an "interconnected stars" cabling topology based on active hubs. Easier cabling, combined with the greater raw speed of Ethernet (10 Mbit/s versus 2.5 Mbit/s for ARCnet) helped to increase Ethernet's demand. As more companies entered the market, the price of Ethernet started to fall while ARCNET and Token Ring volumes tapered off.

=== ARCnet Plus and decline ===
In response to greater bandwidth needs, and the challenge of Ethernet, a new standard called ARCnet Plus was developed by Datapoint and introduced in 1992. ARCnet Plus ran at 20 Mbit/s and was backward-compatible with original ARCnet equipment. However, by the time ARCnet Plus products were ready for the market, Ethernet had captured the majority of the network market and there was little incentive for users to move back to ARCnet. As a result, very few ARCnet Plus products were ever produced. Those that were built, mainly by Datapoint, were expensive and hard to find.

ARCNET was eventually standardized as ANSI ARCNET 878.1. It appears this was when the name changed from ARCnet to ARCNET. Other companies entered the market, notably Standard Microsystems who produced systems based on a single VLSI chip, originally developed as custom LSI for Datapoint, but later made available by Standard Microsystems to other customers. Datapoint eventually found itself in financial trouble and moved into video conferencing then and later to custom programming in the embedded market.

Even though ARCNET is now rarely used for new general networks, the diminishing installed base still requires support and it retains a niche in industrial control.

== Description ==
Original ARCNET used RG-62/U coaxial cable of 93 Ω impedance and either passive or active hubs in a star-wired bus topology. At the time of its greatest popularity, this was a significant advantage of ARCNET over thin Ethernet (10BASE2). A star-wired topology was easier to build, expand and service than the linear Ethernet bus of the time. The "interconnected stars" cabling topology made it easy to add and remove nodes without taking down the whole network, and much easier to diagnose and isolate failures within a complex LAN.

Another significant advantage ARCNET had over Ethernet was cable distance. ARCNET coax cable runs could extend 610 m (2,000 ft) between active hubs or between an active hub and an end node, while the RG-58 (50 Ω) thin Ethernet was limited to a maximum run of 185 m (607 ft) from end to end.

ARCNET had the disadvantage of requiring either an active or passive hub between nodes if there were more than two nodes in the network, while Ethernet allowed nodes to be placed anywhere along the linear coax cable. However, ARCNET passive hubs were very inexpensive, being composed of a simple, small, unpowered box with four BNC ports, wired together with just a star of four 47 Ω resistors, so the disadvantage was not significant. This disadvantage can also be seen as an advantage: often the cost of a 4 port ARCNET passive hub was less than the 4 BNC Tee connectors and 2 terminators that thin Ethernet requires to connect 4 computers. Unlike BNC Tee connectors that could sometimes be hard to obtain in the early days of Ethernet, an ARCNET passive hub could be easily manufactured in the field with 9 readily available parts: 4 connectors, 4 resistors and a box to put them in.

Passive hubs limited the distance between a node and an active hub to 30 m (100 ft). A passive hub could not be connected directly to another passive hub. Unused ports on both types of hubs had to be terminated with a special connector. This special connector, called a terminator, is just a BNC connector with a 93 Ω resistor in it. Thin Ethernet also requires nearly identical terminators at the two terminal ends, the only difference being Ethernet uses a 50 Ω resistor.

To reduce costs while still allowing wide area coverage, a common practice was to use one or more interconnected active hubs, each of which provided coverage for nodes no more than 60 m (200 ft) away. Cable was run from each port of the active hubs to a different location no more than 30 m (100 ft) away. A passive hub would then be attached to the end of the cable, and cables would be run locally from the passive hub, allowing connection of up to three nodes. In this way, a single 8-port active hub could be used to connect 24 networked devices over an area not exceeding 120 m (400 ft) in diameter.

ARCNET allowed only 255 nodes per network. Node IDs for LAN workstations were typically set by DIP switches on the network interface card. Larger networks would have to be split into smaller networks, and bridged. The small number of possible nodes and the need to manually configure IDs was a disadvantage compared with Ethernet, particularly as large enterprise networks became common.

To mediate access to the bus, ARCNET, like Token Ring, uses a token passing scheme, rather than the carrier sense multiple access approach of Ethernet. When peers are inactive, a single "token" message is passed around the network from machine to machine and no peer is allowed to use the bus unless it has the token. If a particular peer wishes to send a message, it waits to receive the token, sends its message then passes the token on to the next station. Because ARCNET is implemented as a distributed star, the token cannot be passed machine to machine around a ring. Instead, each node is assigned an 8 bit address (usually via DIP switches), and when a new node joins the network a "reconfig" occurs, wherein each node learns the address of the node immediately above it. The token is then passed directly from one node to the next.

Historically, each approach had its advantages: ARCNET added a small delay on an inactive network as a sending station waited to receive the token, but Ethernet's original, shared-medium performance with CSMA/CD degraded drastically if too many peers attempted to broadcast at the same time, due to the time required for the slower processors of the day to process and recover from collisions. ARCNET had slightly lower best-case performance (viewed by a single stream), but was much more predictable. ARCNET also has the advantage that it achieved its best aggregate performance under the highest loading, approaching asymptotically its maximum throughput. While the best case performance was less than Ethernet, the general case was equivalent and the worst case was dramatically better. An Ethernet network could collapse when too busy due to excessive collisions. An ARCNET would keep on going at normal (or even better) throughput. Throughput on a multi-node collision-based Ethernet was limited to between 40% and 60% of bandwidth usage (depending on source). Although 2.5 Mbit/s ARCNET could at one time outperform a 10 Mbit/s Ethernet in a busy office on slow processors, ARCNET ultimately gave way to Ethernet as improved processor speeds reduced the impact of collisions on overall throughput, and Ethernet costs dropped.

In the early 1980s, ARCNET was much cheaper than Ethernet, in particular for PCs. For example, in 1985 SMC sold ARCNET cards for around US$300 whilst an Ungermann-Bass Ethernet card plus transceiver could cost US$500.

Another significant difference is that ARCNET provides the sender with a definite success/failure status of delivery at the receiver before the token passes on to the next node. This permits much faster fault recovery within the higher level protocols, rather than having to wait for a timeout on the expected replies. ARCNET also doesn't waste network time transmitting to a node not ready to receive the message, since the initial hardware-level inquiry establishes that the recipient is able and ready to receive the larger message before it is sent across the bus.

One further advantage that ARCNET enjoyed over collision-based Ethernet is that it guarantees equitable access to the bus by everyone on the network. Although it takes a time to get the token depending on the number of nodes and the size of the messages currently being sent, a node will always receive it within a predictable maximum time. It is therefore deterministic. This made ARCNET an ideal real-time networking system, which explains its use in the embedded systems and process control markets. Token Ring has similar qualities, but is much more expensive to implement than ARCNET.

In spite of ARCNET's deterministic operation and historic suitability for real-time environments such as process control, the general availability of switched gigabit Ethernet and Quality of service capabilities in Ethernet switches has all but eliminated ARCNET today.

At first the system was deployed using the RG-62/U coaxial cable commonly used in IBM mainframe environments to connect 3270 terminals and controllers, but later added support for twisted pair and fibre media. At ARCNET's lower speeds (2.5 Mbit/s), Cat-3 cable is good enough to run ARCNET. Some ARCNET twisted-pair products supported cable runs over 2,000 ft (610 m) on standard Cat-3 cable, far beyond anything Ethernet could do on any kind of copper cable.

In the early 1990s, Thomas-Conrad Corporation developed a 100 Mbit/s topology called TCNS based on the ARCNET protocol, which also supported RG-62, twisted-pair, and fiber optic media. TCNS enjoyed some success until the availability of lower-cost 100 Mbit/s Ethernet put an end to the general deployment of ARCNET as a LAN protocol.

However, because of its simple and robust nature, ARCNET controllers are still sold and used in industrial, embedded, and automotive applications.

== See also ==
- List of device bandwidths
