= Manufacturing Automation Protocol =

Set of computer network communication protocols

Manufacturing Automation Protocol (MAP) was a computer network standard released in 1982 for interconnection of devices from multiple manufacturers. It was developed by General Motors to combat the proliferation of incompatible communications standards used by suppliers of automation products such as programmable controllers. By 1985 demonstrations of interoperability were carried out and 21 vendors offered MAP products. In 1986 the Boeing corporation merged its Technical Office Protocol with the MAP standard, and the combined standard was referred to as "MAP/TOP". The standard was revised several times between the first issue in 1982 and MAP 3.0 in 1987, with significant technical changes that made interoperation between different revisions of the standard difficult.

Although promoted and used by manufacturers such as General Motors, Boeing, and others, it lost market share to the contemporary Ethernet standard and was not widely adopted. Difficulties included changing protocol specifications, the expense of MAP interface links, and the speed penalty of a token-passing network. The token bus network protocol used by MAP became standardized as IEEE standard 802.4 but this committee disbanded in 2004 due to lack of industry attention.

== See also ==
- Common Industrial Protocol – Protocol for industrial automation applications
- Computer-integrated manufacturing – Manufacturing controlled by computers
- Factory automation infrastructure – Incorporation of automation in manufacturing
- Fieldbus – Family of industrial computer network protocols
- Manufacturing engineering – Branch of engineering
- Process automation system
