= Performance Technologies =

Former American computer networking company

Performance Technologies Inc
- Company type: Subsidiary
- Industry: Networking and Communication Devices
- Founded: 1981
- Headquarters: Rochester, New York, United States
- Key people: John M. Slusser (Chief Executive Officer, President, and Chairman) Dorrance W. Lamb (Chief Financial Officer, President, and Chairman) (Dec 31, 2012)
- Products: network communications
- Revenue: $ 25.95M (Sep 30, 2013)
- Number of employees: 115 (Sep 30, 2013)

Performance Technologies, Inc was set up in 1981 and now is based in Rochester, New York. The company engages in network communications, telecommunications, and military, aerospace and government systems. In January 2011, Performance Technologies acquired GENBAND's Universal Signaling Platform (USP) and SP2000 signaling technology.

On December 13, 2013, Sonus Networks, Inc. and Performance Technologies entered into a definitive merger agreement, under which Sonus will acquire PT for $3.75 per share in cash, or approximately $30 million.

== Products ==
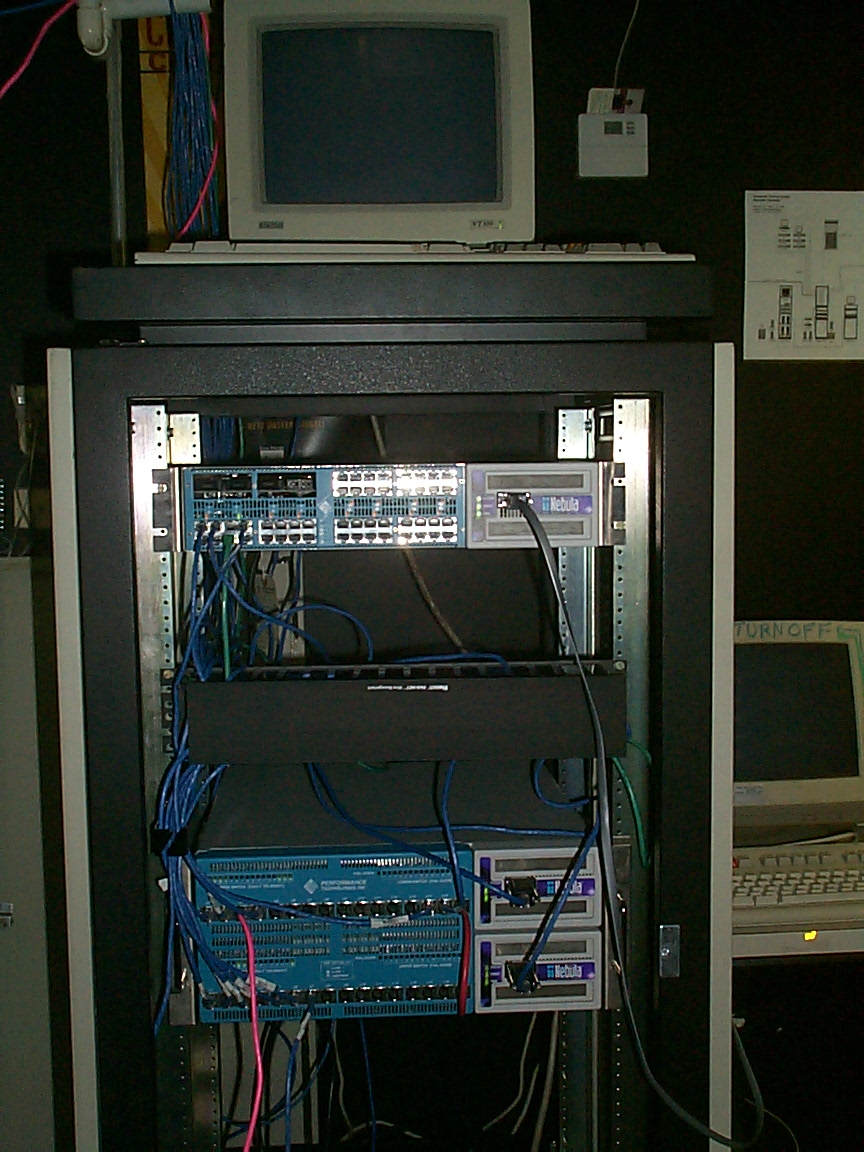
A server rack with several Nebula switches made by Performance Technologies (1999)

SEGway Signaling Solutions
SEGway Signaling Solutions provide integrated signaling, routing, IP migration, gateway capabilities, session initiation protocol (SIP) bridging, and distributed intelligence for 4G LTE and IMS telecommunications networks.
Monterey and IPnexus Application-Ready Platforms
These platforms are built on PT's hardware combined with PT's NexusWare Carrier Grade Linux operating system, enabling a range of IP (Internet protocol)-interworking in data acquisition, sensor, radar, and control applications for aviation, weather, and other infrastructure networks. PT's Monterey 8000 platform is the newest Monterey MicroTCA products.
Xpress SIP Applications
The Company's Xpress NGN (next-generation network) applications enable Mobile 2.0, Multi-media, and IMS-based revenue-generating services. There are mainly four Xpress applications: Prepaid/Postpaid services, Voice Messaging, Private Network Cost Optimizer and Telemarketer Guard.

== Operations ==
In December 2013, Sonus Networks, Inc. reached an agreement to acquire Performance Technologies, Inc. for $3.75 per share in cash, or approximately $30 million, net of PT's cash and excluding acquisition-related costs.

== Research and development ==
- October 2013, Diameter to SS7/MAP Interworking capability for the SEGway Universal Diameter Router (UDR), providing enhanced roaming capability and easy to migration to LTE (Long Term Evolution)/EPC network topologies.
- May 2012, Universal Diameter Router (UDR), broadening the company’s SEGway Signaling line of IP-native products.
- October 2011, Xpress Telemarketer Guard (TMG) added to its Xpress suite of next generation network solutions, helping intercept and divert annoying telemarketing calls.
- February 2010, PT introduced the AMP5072 1U MicroTCA Application-Ready System for LTE and WiMAX equipment manufacturers, and features Serial RapidIO for wireless base station synchronization.

== Awards ==
- 2011.11, the company won the Best of Show-Hardware Award by the Advanced Micro TCA Summit for its Monterey 8000?, filling a gap between ATCA Core systems and smaller MicroTCA Edge platforms.
- 2011.4, the company won the Raytheon’s Supplier Excellence Award by Raytheon Integrated Defense Systems.
