= Elliott 152 =

- Developer: Elliott Brothers
- Released: 1950; 76 years ago
- Units sold: 1
- Memory: 256, 16-bit words (16 Williams tubes)

The Elliot 152 was a vacuum tube fixed-program computer developed for naval gunnery control at the Elliott Brothers laboratory in Borehamwood, Hertfordshire. It was an early example of a digital real-time computer system, and the first computer produced by Elliott Brothers. The first and only unit was made operational in 1950.

The machine used 16-bit words and two's complement binary arithmetic. Instruction words were 20 bits long. Read/write memory was provided by a bank of 16 Williams tubes, a cathode-ray tube that could store 256 bits of data – the total memory was 256 16-bit words. The access time of the memory limited the processor clock speed to 333 kHz. The computer could multiply two numbers in 60 microseconds. The system hardware was built on glass printed circuit board modules, but these proved to be unreliable. Intended as the centrepiece of the MRS5 fire control system, instead the Admiralty proceeded with an alternative design based on analog electronics. However, experience with the 152 was valuable to Elliott Brothers in the development of their other models of computer.

== See also ==
- List of vacuum-tube computers
