= Bit-serial architecture =

Computational system in which data are sent one bit at a time down a wire

In computer architecture, bit-serial architectures send data one bit at a time, along a single wire, in contrast to bit-parallel word architectures, in which data values are sent all bits or a word at once along a group of wires.

All digital computers built before 1951, and most of the early massive parallel processing machines used a bit-serial architecture—they were serial computers.

Bit-serial architectures were developed for digital signal processing in the 1960s through 1980s, including efficient structures for bit-serial multiplication and accumulation.

The HP Nut processor used in many Hewlett-Packard calculators operated bit-serially.

Assuming N is an arbitrary integer number, N serial processors will often take less FPGA area and have a higher total performance than a single N-bit parallel processor.

== See also ==
- Serial computer
- 1-bit computing
- Bit banging
- Bit slicing
- BKM algorithm
- CORDIC
