= Programming Language for Business =

- Paradigm: Procedural, imperative
- First appeared: 1972
- Typing discipline: Strong, static
- Filename extensions: .rl, .ps, .cb, .pls, .pgm

Major implementations
- DB/C DX, DATABUS, and PL/B

Influenced by
- COBOL

Programming Language for Business or PL/B is a business-oriented programming language originally called DATABUS and designed by Datapoint in 1972 as an alternative to COBOL because Datapoint's 8-bit computers could not fit COBOL into their limited memory, and because COBOL did not at the time have facilities to deal with Datapoint's built-in keyboard and screen.

A version of DATABUS became an ANSI standard, and the name PL/B came about when Datapoint chose not to release its trademark on the DATABUS name.

== Functionality ==
Much like Java and .NET, PL/B programs are compiled into an intermediate byte-code, which is then interpreted by a runtime library. Because of this, many PL/B programs can run on MS-DOS, Unix, Linux, and Windows. PL/B (Databus) is actively used all over the world, and has several forums on the Internet dedicated to supporting software developers.

PL/B has a database capability built-in with ISAM and Associative Hashed Indexes, as well as functionality for working with ODBC, SQL, Oracle, sequential, random access, XML and JSON files.

PL/B also has the ability to access external routines through COM objects, DLLs and .NET assemblies. Full access to the .NET framework is built into many versions.

Several implementations of the language are capable of running as an Application Server like Citrix, and connecting to remote databases through a data manager.

== Source code example ==
        IF (DF_EDIT[ITEM] = "PHYS")
           STATESAVE MYSTATE
           IF (C_F07B != 2)
              DISPLAY   *SETSWALL 1:1:1:80:
                        *BGCOLOR=2,*COLOR=15:
                        *P49:1," 7-Find "
           ELSE
              DISPLAY   *SETSWALL 1:1:1:80:
                        *BGCOLOR=7,*COLOR=0:
                        *P49:1," 7-Find "
           ENDIF
           STATEREST MYSTATE
           TRAP      GET_PRO NORESET IF F7
        ENDIF
        IF (SHOW_FILTER AND THIS_FILTER AND C_CUSTNO <> "MAG")
           LOADMOD   "filter"
           PACK      PASS_ID WITH "QED     ",QED_ID1,BLANKS
           MOVE      " FILTER DISPLAY (F6)        " TO PASS_DESC
           SET C_BIGFLT
           CALL      RUN_FILT USING PASS_ID,PASS_DESC,"432"
           UNLOAD    "filter"
           CLEAR     THIS_FILTER
        ENDIF
