= Transistor radio =

Portable radio receiver

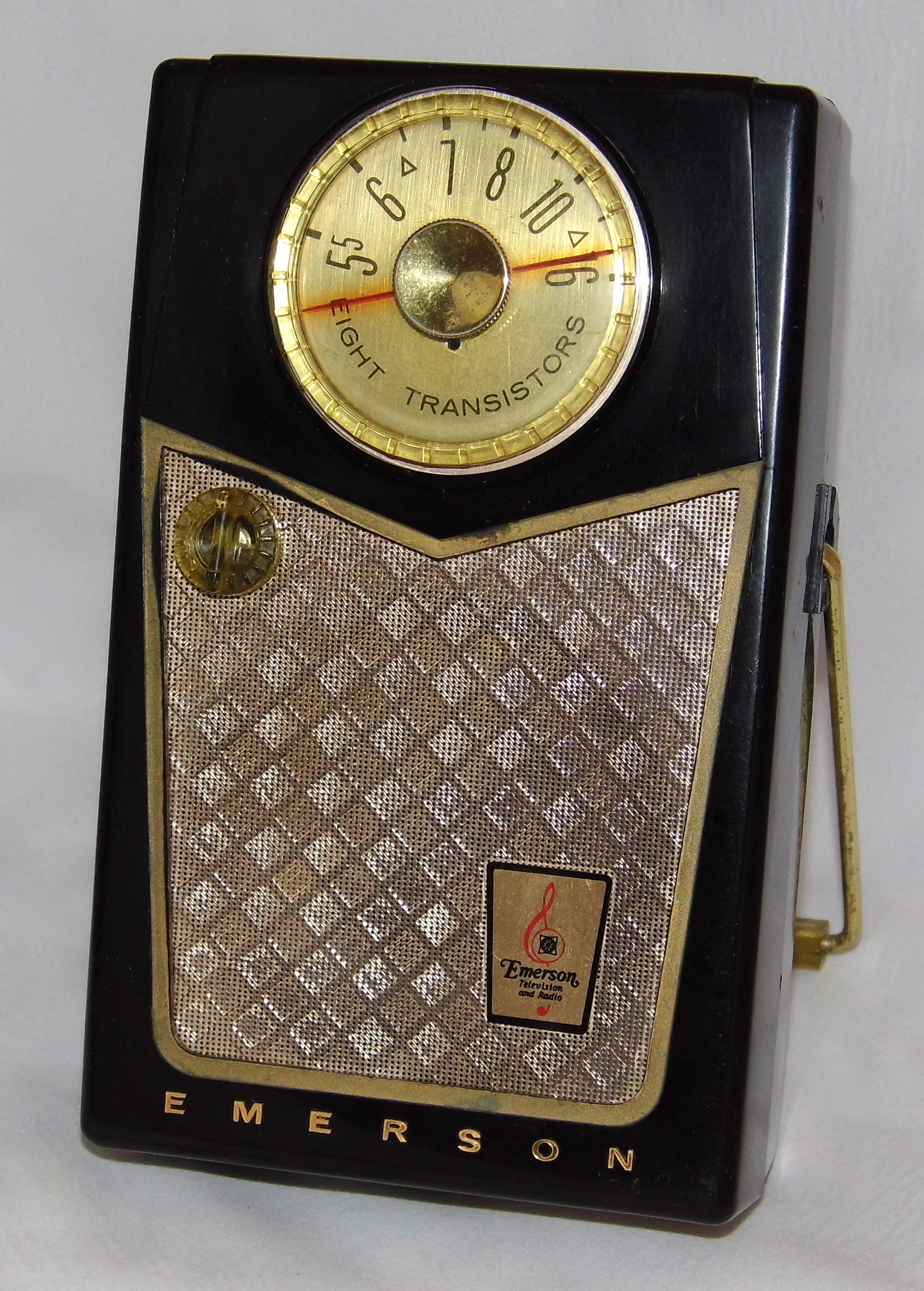
A classic Emerson transistor radio, circa 1958

A transistor radio is a small portable radio receiver that uses transistor-based circuitry. Previous portable radios used vacuum tubes, which were bulky, fragile, had a limited lifetime, consumed excessive power and required large, heavy batteries. Following the invention of the transistor in 1947—a semiconductor device that amplifies and acts as an electronic switch, which revolutionized the field of consumer electronics by introducing small but powerful, convenient hand-held devices—the Regency TR-1 was released in 1954 becoming the first commercial transistor radio. The mass-market success of the smaller and cheaper Sony TR-63, released in 1957, led to the transistor radio becoming the most popular electronic communication device of the 1960s and 1970s. Billions had been manufactured by about 2012.

The pocket size of transistor radios sparked a change in popular music listening habits, allowing people to listen to music and other broadcasts on the radio anywhere they went. Beginning around 1980, however, cheap AM transistor radios were superseded initially by the boombox and the Sony Walkman, and later on by digitally based devices with higher audio quality such as portable CD players, personal audio players, MP3 players and smartphones, many of which contain FM radios. Transistor radios continue to be built and sold for portable and in-car use but the term "transistor" is no longer used in marketing as virtually all modern technology makes use of transistors.

== Background ==
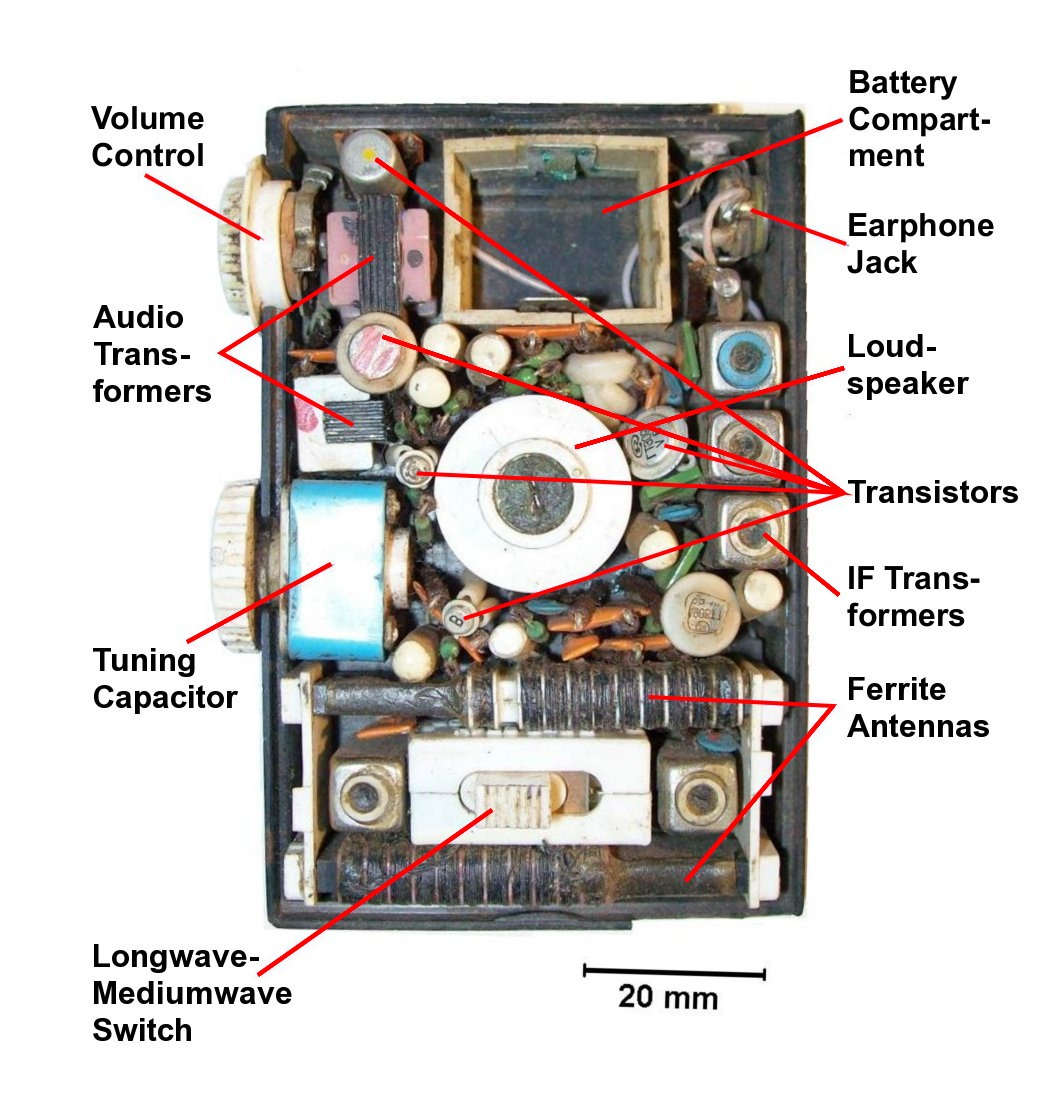
A seven-transistor Soviet Orljonok radio with the back open, showing parts.

Before the transistor was invented, radios used vacuum tubes. Although portable vacuum tube radios were produced, they were typically bulky and heavy. The need for a low-voltage, high-current source to power the filaments of the tubes and high voltage for the anode potential typically required two batteries. Vacuum tubes were also inefficient and fragile compared to transistors and had a limited lifetime.

Bell Laboratories demonstrated the first transistor on 23 December 1947. The scientific team at Bell Laboratories responsible for the solid-state amplifier included William Shockley, Walter Houser Brattain, and John Bardeen After obtaining patent protection, the company held a news conference on 30 June 1948, at which a prototype transistor radio was demonstrated.

There are many claimants to the title of the first company to produce practical transistor radios, often incorrectly attributed to Sony (originally Tokyo Telecommunications Engineering Corporation). Texas Instruments had demonstrated all-transistor AM (amplitude modulation) radios as early as 25 May 1954, but their performance was well below that of equivalent vacuum tube models. A workable all-transistor radio was demonstrated in August 1953 at the Düsseldorf Radio Fair by the German firm Intermetall. It was built with four of Intermetall's hand-made transistors, based upon the 1948 invention of the "Transistor"-germanium point-contact transistor by Herbert Mataré and Heinrich Welker. However, as with the early Texas Instruments units (and others) only prototypes were ever built; it was never put into commercial production. RCA had demonstrated a prototype transistor radio as early as 1952, and it is likely that they and the other radio makers were planning transistor radios of their own, but Texas Instruments and Regency Division of I.D.E.A., were the first to offer a production model starting in October 1954.

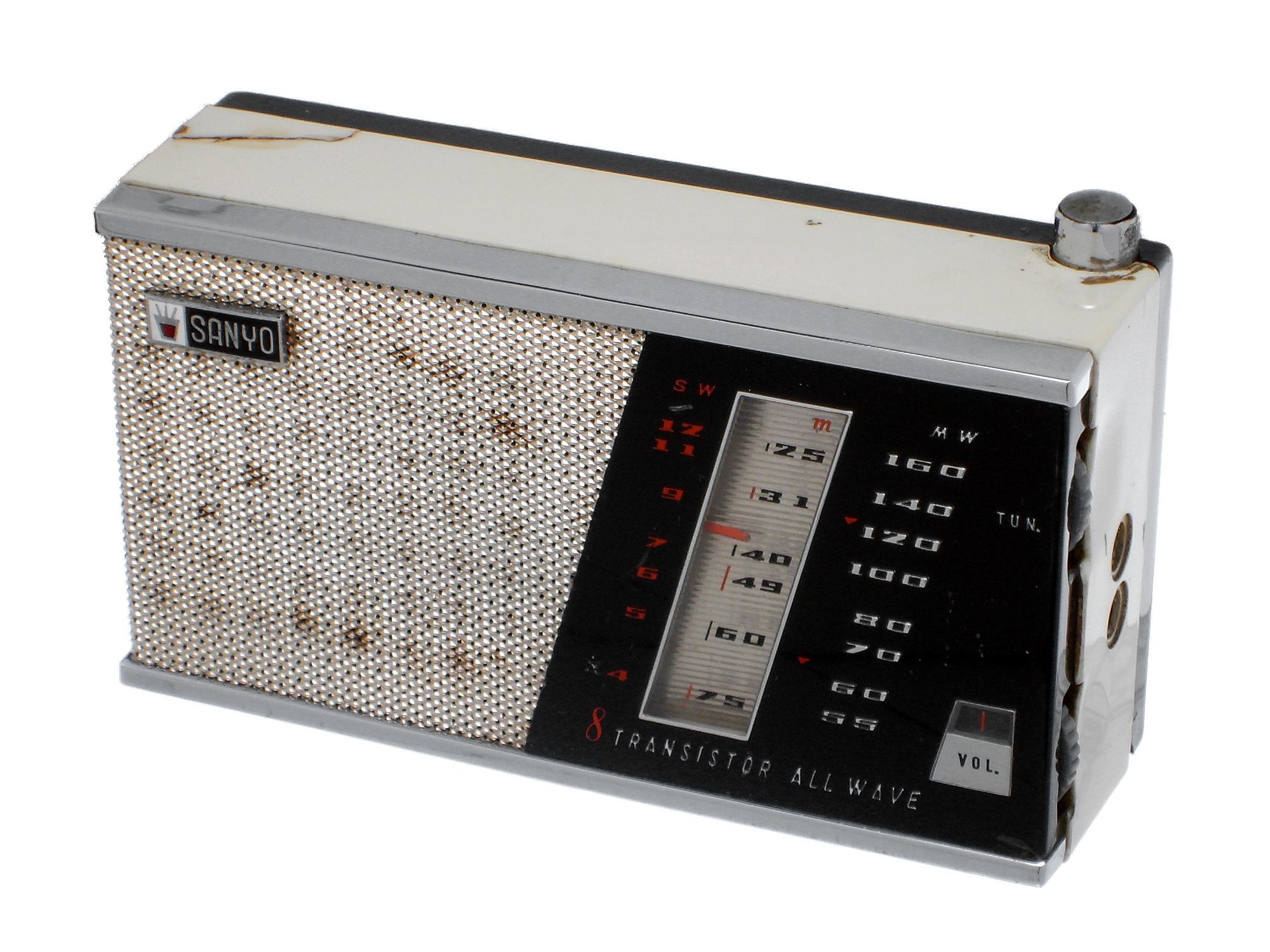
Sanyo 8S-P3 transistor radio, which received AM and shortwave bands.

The use of transistors instead of vacuum tubes as the amplifier elements meant that the device was much smaller, required far less power to operate than a tube radio, and was more resistant to physical shock. Since the transistor's base element draws current, its input impedance is low in contrast to the high input impedance of the vacuum tubes. It also allowed "instant-on" operation, since there were no filaments to heat up. The typical portable tube radio of the 1950s was about the size and weight of a lunchbox and contained several heavy, non-rechargeable batteries—one or more so-called "A" batteries to heat the tube filaments and a large 45- to 90-volt "B" battery to power the signal circuits.

By comparison, transistor radios were smaller and shrank until they could fit in a pocket and weighed half a pound or less. The 1954 radios needed 22½V brick-like prismatic batteries, and 1956 radios were the first to run on 9 V, both of whose batteries came in different sizes for capacity and the latter also usually used flat heavy batteries but sometimes can or cylindrical batteries. The common small flat 9-volt battery that went on to dominate the market was popularized by the Sony TR-63 made in 1957 by Tokyo Tsushin Kogyo. The instructions sticker inside specified the battery models that took, those of the small size that had been produced the year earlier:

JIS : BL-006P
EVEREADY : 216, E146
RAY-O-VAC : 1604
MALLORY : TR-146R

== Early commercial transistor radios ==
=== Regency TR-1 ===
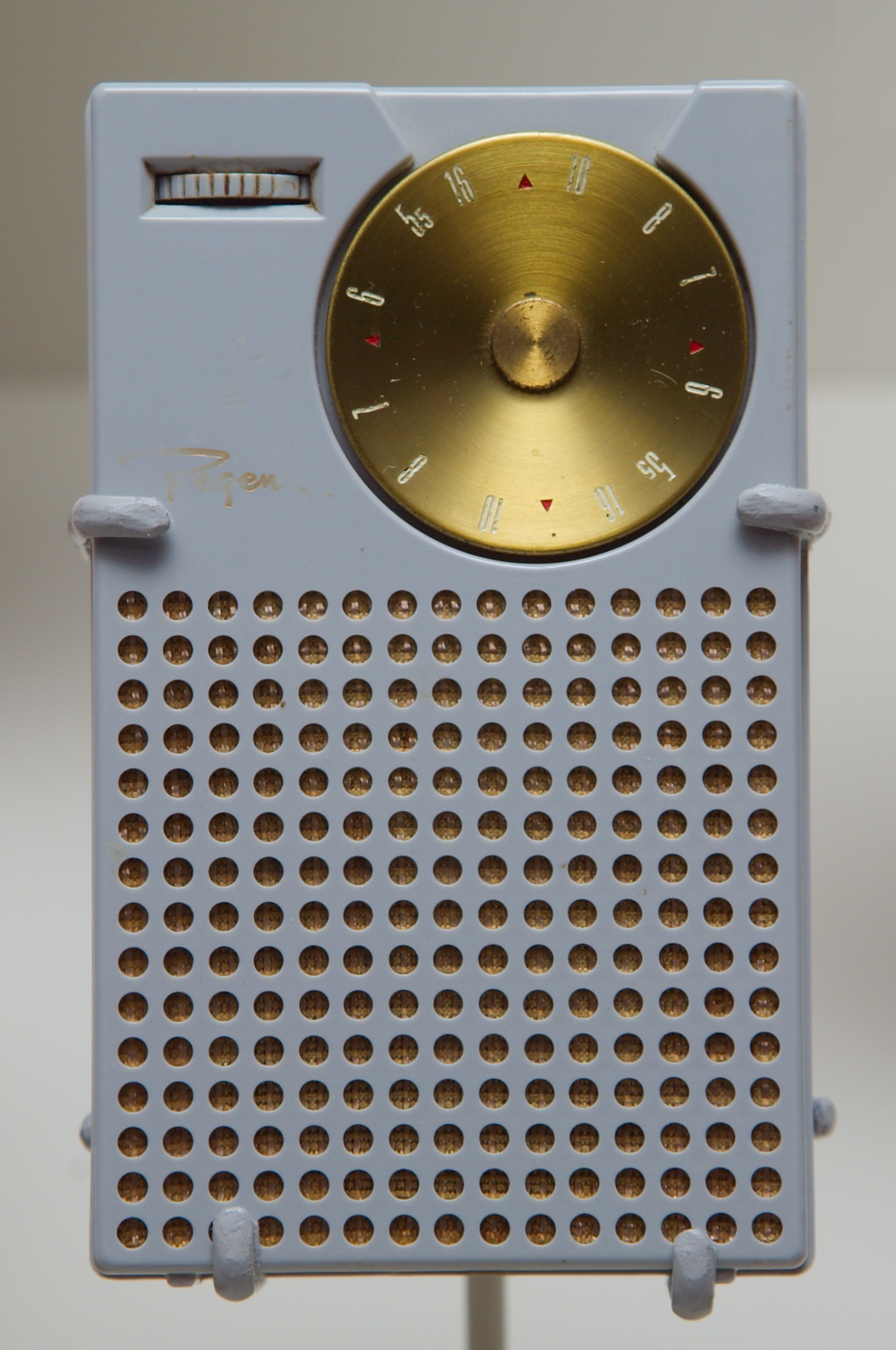
Regency TR-1.

Two companies working together, Texas Instruments of Dallas, and Industrial Development Engineering Associates (I.D.E.A.) of Indianapolis, Indiana, were behind the unveiling of the Regency TR-1, the world's first commercially produced transistor radio. Previously, Texas Instruments was producing instrumentation for the oil industry and locating devices for the U.S. Navy and I.D.E.A. built home television antenna boosters. The two companies worked together on the TR-1, looking to grow revenues for their respective companies by breaking into this new product area. In May 1954, Texas Instruments had designed and built a prototype and was looking for an established radio manufacturer to develop and market a radio using their transistors. The chief project engineer for the radio design at Texas Instruments' headquarters in Dallas, Texas, was Paul D. Davis Jr., who had a degree in electrical engineering from Southern Methodist University. He was assigned the project due to his experience with radio engineering in World War II. None of the major radio makers including RCA, GE, Philco, and Emerson were interested. The President of I.D.E.A. at the time, Ed Tudor, jumped at the opportunity to manufacture the TR-1, predicting sales of the transistor radios at "20 million radios in three years". The Regency TR-1 was announced on 18 October 1954 by the Regency Division of I.D.E.A., was put on sale in November 1954 and was the first practical transistor radio made in any significant numbers. Billboard reported in 1954 that "the radio has only four transistors. One acts as a combination mixer-oscillator, one as an audio amplifier, and two as intermediate-frequency amplifiers." One year after the release of the TR-1 sales approached the 100,000 mark. The look and size of the TR-1 were well received, but with only four transistors the sound quality was poor, and the reviews of the TR-1's performance were typically adverse. The Regency TR-1 was patented by Richard C. Koch, former Project Engineer of I.D.E.A.

=== Raytheon 8-TP-1 ===
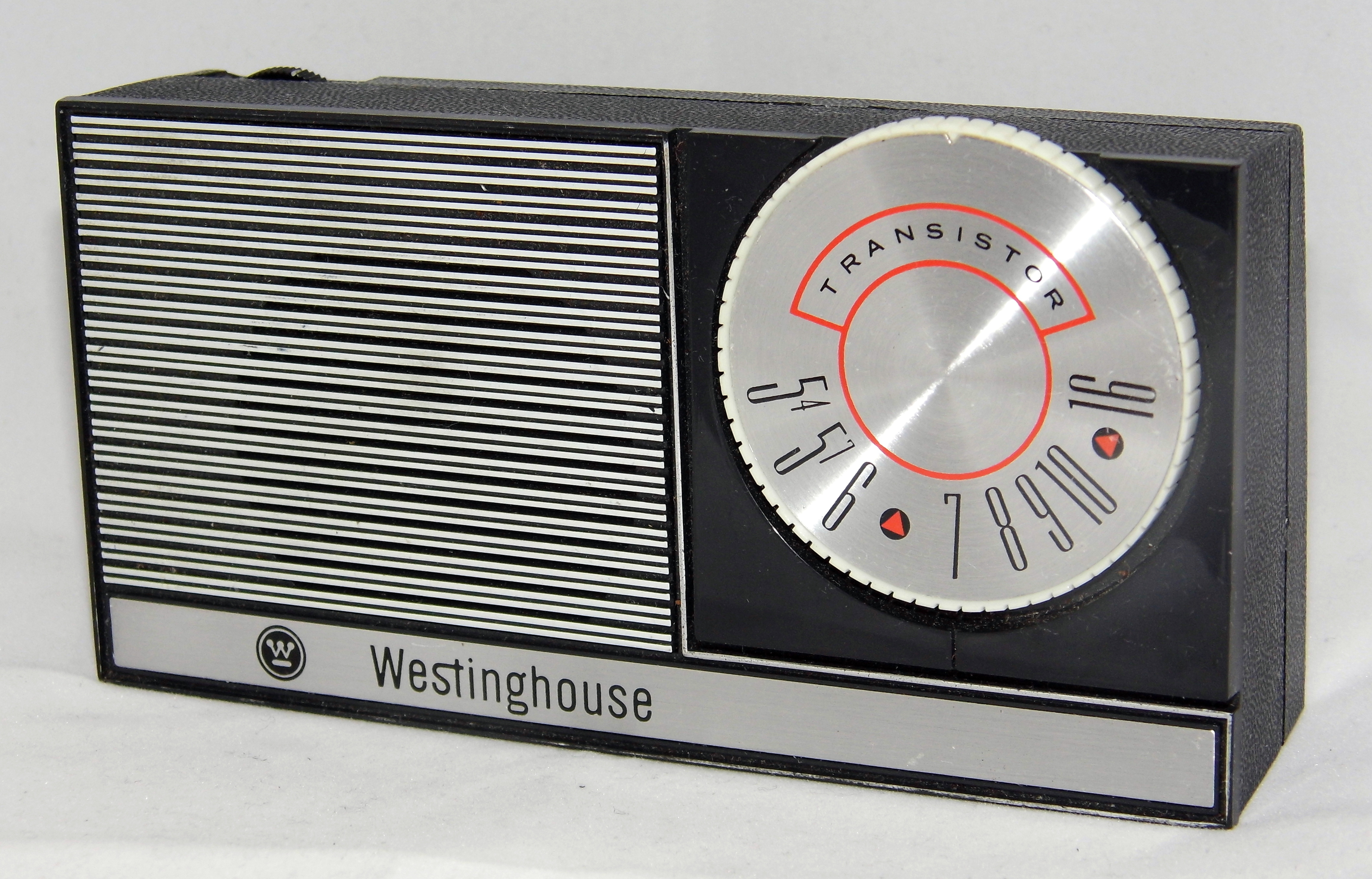
Westinghouse Model H-842P6 (c. 1962)

In February 1955, the second transistor radio, the 8-TP-1, was introduced by Raytheon. It was larger than the TR-1, including a four-inch speaker and eight transistors, four more than the TR-1, so the sound quality was much better. An additional benefit of the 8-TP-1 was its efficient battery consumption; the 8-TP-1 cost 1/6 cent per hour to operate, while the TR-1 cost 40 times as much. While the Raytheon radio cost $30 more than the RCA 6-BX-63 tube radio, the latter used $38 of batteries over the same time that the 8-TP-1 used 60 cents. In July 1955, the first positive review of a transistor radio appeared in the Consumer Reports. Noting the 8-TP-1's high sound quality and very low battery cost, the magazine stated that "The transistors in this set have not been used in an effort to build the smallest radio on the market, and good performance has not been sacrificed".

Following the success of the 8-TP-1, Zenith, RCA, DeWald, Westinghouse, and Crosley produced many additional transistor radio models. The TR-1 remained the only shirt pocket-sized radio; rivals made "coat-pocket radios" that Consumer Reports also reviewed as not performing well.

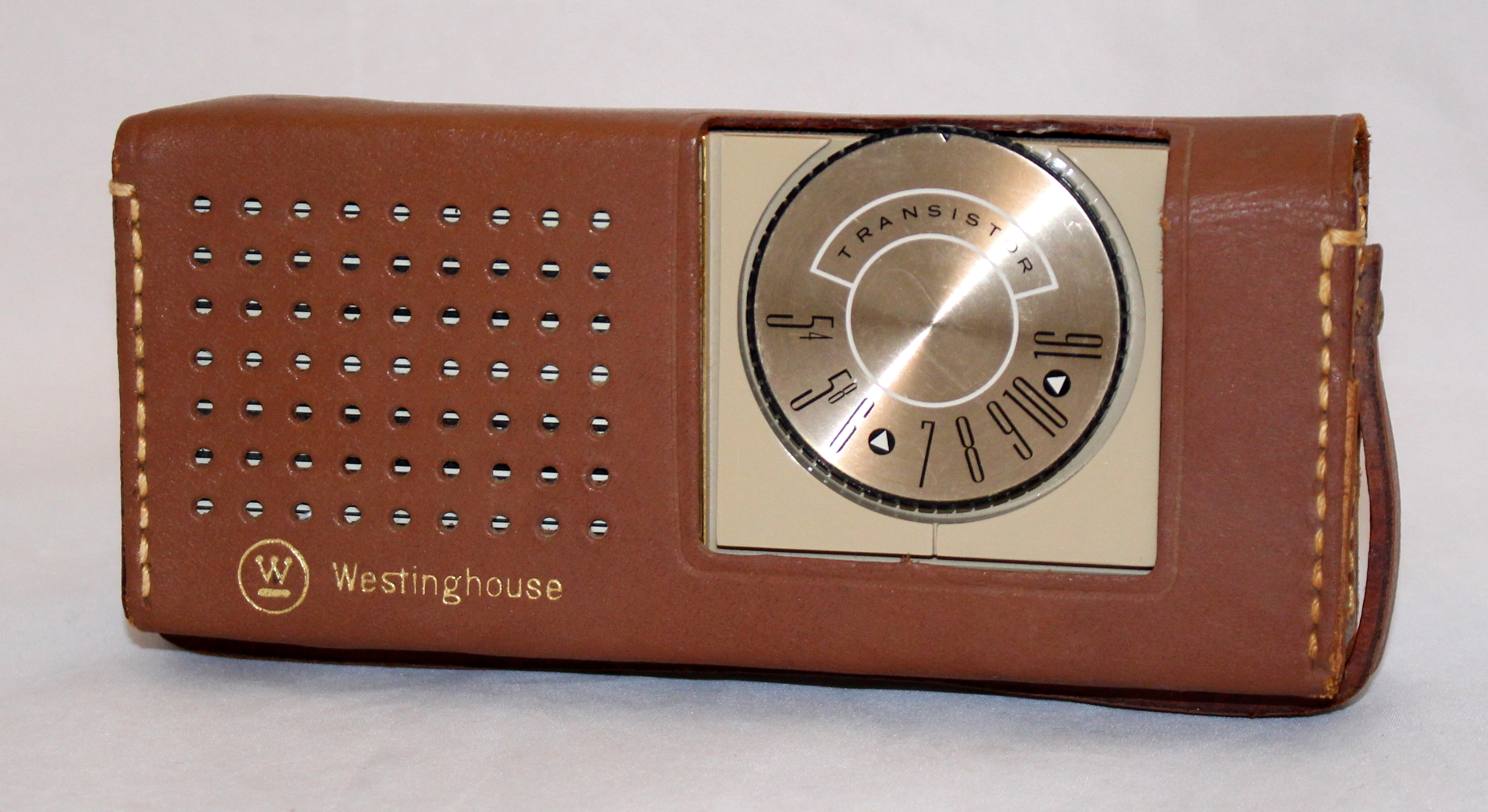
Westinghouse transistor radio, Model H841P6 (c. 1963)

=== Chrysler Mopar 914HR ===
1955 Chrysler – Philco all transistor car radio – "Breaking News" radio broadcast announcement.

Chrysler and Philco announced that they had developed and produced the world's first all-transistor car radio in the 28 April 1955 edition of the Wall Street Journal. Chrysler made the all-transistor car radio, Mopar model 914HR, available as an "option" in fall 1955 for its new line of 1956 Chrysler and Imperial cars, which hit the showroom floor on 21 October 1955. The all-transistor car radio was a $150 option (equivalent to $1,800 in 2025).

== Japanese transistor radios ==
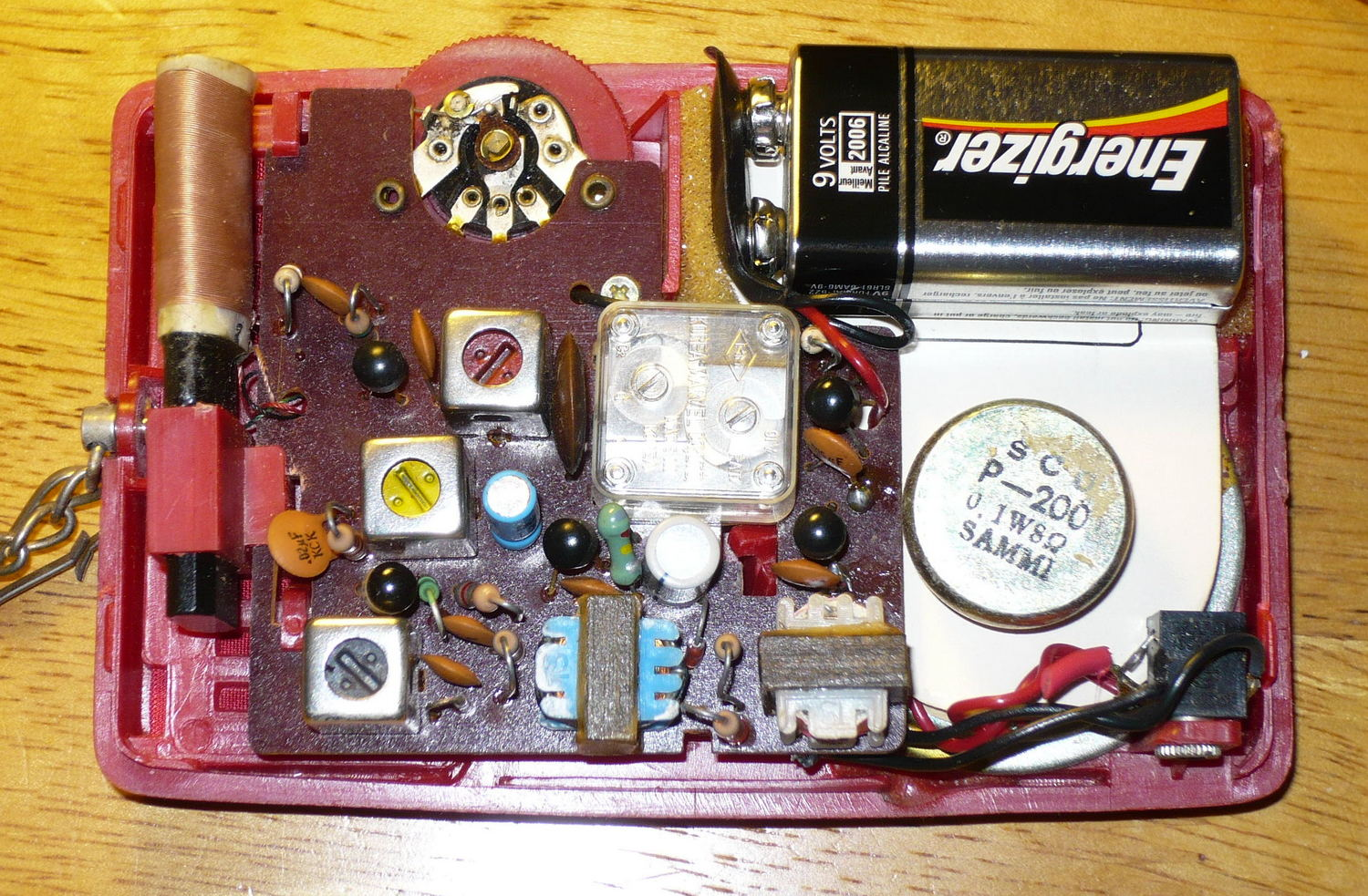
The circuit of a Japanese 5 transistor radio, powered by a 9V battery.

While on a trip to the United States in 1952, Masaru Ibuka, founder of Tokyo Telecommunications Engineering Corporation (now Sony), discovered that AT&T was about to make licensing available for the transistor. Ibuka and his partner, physicist Akio Morita, convinced the Japanese Ministry of International Trade and Industry (MITI) to finance the $25,000 licensing fee (equivalent to $303,102 today). For several months, Ibuka traveled around the United States borrowing ideas from the American transistor manufacturers. Improving upon the ideas, Tokyo Telecommunications Engineering Corporation made its first functional transistor radio in 1954. Within five years, Tokyo Telecommunications Engineering Corporation grew from seven employees to approximately five hundred.

Other Japanese companies soon followed their entry into the American market and the grand total of electronic products exported from Japan in 1958 increased 2.5 times in comparison to 1957.

=== Sony TR-55 ===
In August 1955, while still a small company, Tokyo Telecommunications Engineering Corporation introduced their TR-55 five-transistor radio under the new brand name Sony. With this radio, Sony became the first company to manufacture the transistors and other components they used to construct the radio. The TR-55 was also the first transistor radio to utilize all miniature components. It's estimated that only 5,000 to 10,000 units were produced.

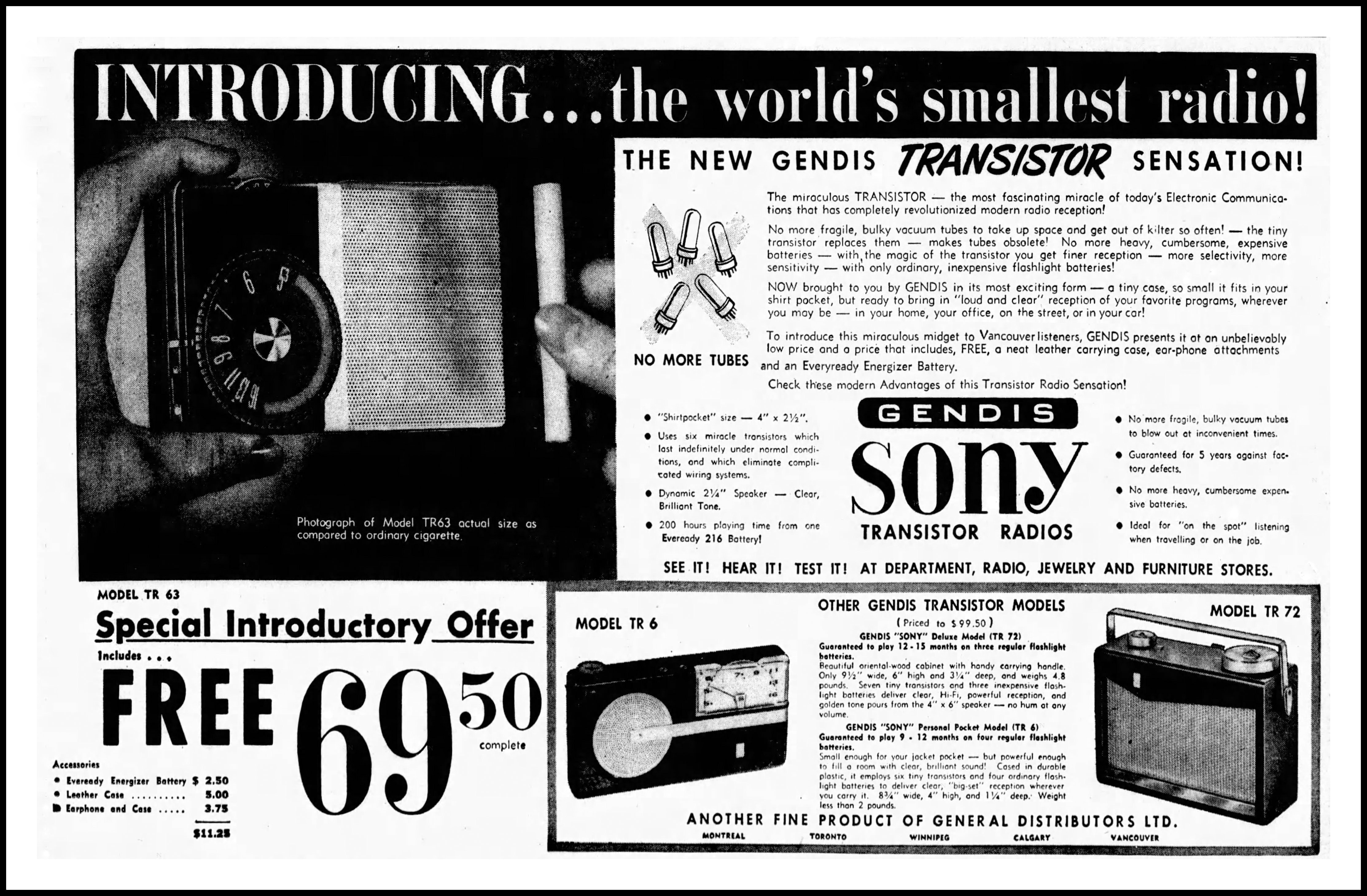
Advertising for TR-63

=== Sony TR-63 ===
The TR-63 was introduced by Sony to the United States in December 1957. The TR-63 was 6 mm (1/4 in) narrower and 13 mm (1/2 in) shorter than the original Regency TR-1. Like the TR-1 it was offered in four colors: lemon, green, red, and black. In addition to its smaller size, the TR-63 had a small tuning capacitor and required a new battery design to produce the proper voltage. It used the nine-volt battery, which would become the standard for transistor radios. Approximately 100,000 units of the TR-63 were imported in 1957. This "pocketable" (the term "pocketable" was a matter of some interpretation, as Sony allegedly had special shirts made with oversized pockets for their salesmen) model proved highly successful. This should be treated with caution. A restored Sony TR-63 readily fits a common shirt pocket.

The TR-63 was the first transistor radio to sell in the millions, leading to the mass-market penetration of transistor radios. The TR-63 went on to sell seven million units worldwide by the mid-1960s. With the visible success of the TR-63, Japanese competitors such as Toshiba and Sharp Corporation joined the market. By 1959, in the United States market, there were more than six million transistor radio sets produced by Japanese companies that represented $62 million in revenue.

The success of transistor radios led to transistors replacing vacuum tubes as the dominant electronic technology in the late 1950s. The transistor radio went on to become the most popular electronic communication device of the 1960s and 1970s. Billions of transistor radios are estimated to have been sold worldwide between the 1950s and 2012.

== Pricing ==
Prior to the Regency TR-1, transistors were difficult to produce. Only one in five transistors that were produced worked as expected (only a 20% yield) and as a result the price remained extremely high. When it was released in 1954, the Regency TR-1 cost $49.95 (equivalent to $599 today) and sold about 150,000 units. Raytheon and Zenith Electronics transistor radios soon followed and were priced even higher. In 1955, Raytheon's 8-TR-1 was priced at $80 (equivalent to $961 today). By November 1956 a transistor radio small enough to wear on the wrist and a claimed battery life of 100 hours cost $29.95.

Sony's TR-63, released in December 1957, cost $39.95 (equivalent to $459 today). Following the success of the TR-63 Sony continued to make their transistor radios smaller. Because of the extremely low labor costs in Japan, Japanese transistor radios began selling for as low as $25. By 1962, the TR-63 cost as low as $15 (equivalent to $160 today), which led to American manufacturers dropping prices of transistor radios down to $15 as well.

== In popular culture ==
Rock 'n roll music became popular at the same time as transistor radios. Parents found that purchasing a small transistor radio was a way for children to listen to their music without using the family tube radio. Sony and other Japanese companies were much faster than Americans to focus on stylish, pocket-sized radios for the youth market, helping them to dominate the radio market. American companies began using lower-cost Japanese components but their radios were less attractive or sophisticated. By 1964, no transistor radio with only US components was available; by the mid-1960s, the Japanese radio components had also been supplanted by even less-expensive manufacturing in Korea, Taiwan, and Hong Kong. The Zenith Trans-Oceanic 7000 was, until 1970, the last transistor radio manufactured in the US.

Transistor radios were extremely successful because of three social forces—a large number of young people due to the post–World War II baby boom, a public with disposable income amidst a period of prosperity, and the growing popularity of rock 'n' roll music. The influence of the transistor radio during this period is shown by its appearance in popular films, songs, and books of the time, such as the movie Lolita.

Inexpensive transistor radios running on batteries enabled many in impoverished rural areas to become regular radio listeners for the first time. Music broadcast from New Orleans and received in Jamaica through transistor radios inspired the development of ska, and less directly, reggae music.

In the late 1950s, transistor radios took on more elaborate designs as a result of heated competition. Eventually, transistor radios doubled as novelty items. The small components of transistor radios that became smaller over time were used to make anything from "Jimmy Carter Peanut-shaped" radios to "Gun-shaped" radios to "Mork from Ork Eggship-shaped" radios. Corporations used transistor radios to advertise their business. "Charlie the Tuna-shaped" radios could be purchased from Star-Kist for an insignificant amount of money, giving their company visibility amongst the public. These novelty radios are now bought and sold as collector's items amongst modern-day collectors.

== Rise of portable audio players ==
Since the 1980s, the popularity of radio-only portable devices declined with the rise of portable audio players which allowed users to carry and listen to tape-recorded music. This began in the late 1970s with boom boxes and portable cassette players such as the Sony Walkman, followed by portable CD players, digital audio players, and smartphones.

== See also ==
- Broadcasting
