= Lilienfeld (disambiguation) =

Lilienfeld may refer to:

- Lilienfeld, a city in Lower Austria
- Lilienfeld (surname), a German surname
- Lilienfeld Abbey, a Cistercian monastery in Lilienfeld, Austria
- Lilienfeld District, a district of the state of Lower Austria in Austria
- Lilienfeld Prize, Award of the American Physical Society
- Lilienfeld radiation, a electromagnetic radiation
