= Lilienfeld (surname) =

Lilienfeld is a German surname. Notable people with the surname include:

- Abraham Lilienfeld (1920–1984), American epidemiologist
- Julius Edgar Lilienfeld (1882–1963), German-American engineer and inventor
- Nikolaus Lilienfeld, German engineer and clockmaker
- Paul von Lilienfeld (1829–1903), Russian statesman and social scientist
- Scott Lilienfeld (1960–2020), American author, professor, psychologist

== See also ==
- Lilienfeld (disambiguation)
