= Mataré =

Mataré is a surname. Notable people with the surname include:

- Ewald Mataré (1887–1965), German painter and sculptor
- Herbert Mataré (1912–2011), German physicist
