= History of the transistor =

Transistor technology timeline (summary)
Year	Technology	Organization
1947	Point contact	Bell Labs
1948	Grown junction	Bell Labs
1951	Alloy junction	General Electric
1953	Surface barrier	Philco
1953	JFET	Bell Labs
1954	Diffused base	Bell Labs
1954	Mesa	Bell Labs
1959	Planar	Fairchild
1959	MOSFET	Bell Labs

A transistor is a semiconductor device with at least three terminals for connection to an electric circuit. In the common case, the third terminal controls the flow of current between the other two terminals. This can be used for amplification, as in the case of a radio receiver, or for rapid switching, as in the case of digital circuits. The transistor replaced the vacuum-tube triode, also called a (thermionic) valve, which was much larger in size and used significantly more power to operate. The first transistor was successfully demonstrated on December 23, 1947, at Bell Laboratories in Murray Hill, New Jersey. Bell Labs was the research arm of American Telephone and Telegraph (AT&T). The three individuals credited with the invention of the transistor were William Shockley, John Bardeen and Walter Brattain. The introduction of the transistor is often considered one of the most important inventions in history.

Transistors are broadly classified into two categories: bipolar junction transistor (BJT) and field-effect transistor (FET).

The principle of a field-effect transistor was proposed by Julius Edgar Lilienfeld in 1925. John Bardeen, Walter Brattain and William Shockley invented the first working transistors at Bell Labs, the point-contact transistor in 1947. Shockley introduced the improved bipolar junction transistor in 1948, which entered production in the early 1950s and led to the first widespread use of transistors.

The MOSFET was invented at Bell Labs between 1955 and 1960, after Frosch and Derick discovered surface passivation by silicon dioxide and used their finding to create the first planar transistors, the first in which drain and source were adjacent at the same surface. This breakthrough led to mass-production of MOS transistors for a wide range of uses, becoming the basis of processors and solid memories. The MOSFET has since become the most widely manufactured device in history.

== Origins of transistor concept ==
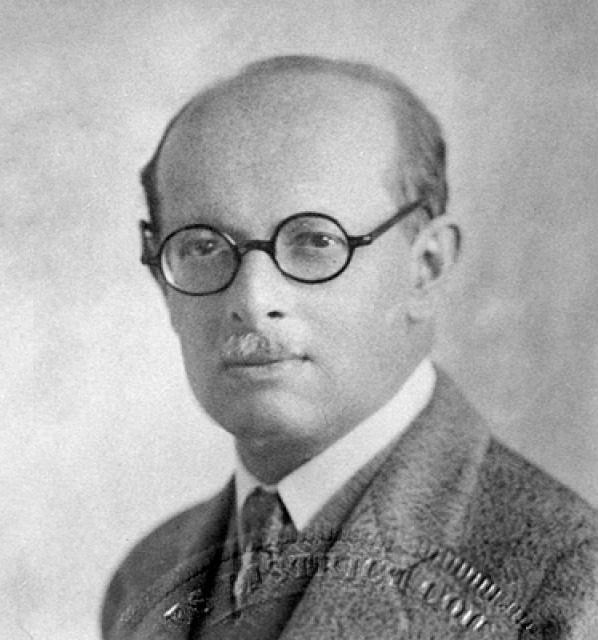
Julius Edgar Lilienfeld, c. 1934

The first patent for the field-effect transistor principle was filed in Canada by Austrian-Hungarian physicist Julius Edgar Lilienfeld on October 22, 1925, but Lilienfeld published no research articles about his devices, and his work was ignored by industry. In 1934 German physicist Dr. Oskar Heil patented another field-effect transistor. There is no direct evidence that these devices were built, but later work in the 1990s show that one of Lilienfeld's designs worked as described and gave substantial gain. Legal papers from the Bell Labs patent show that William Shockley and a co-worker at Bell Labs, Gerald Pearson, had built operational versions from Lilienfeld's patents, though their final transistor designs were based on different principles.

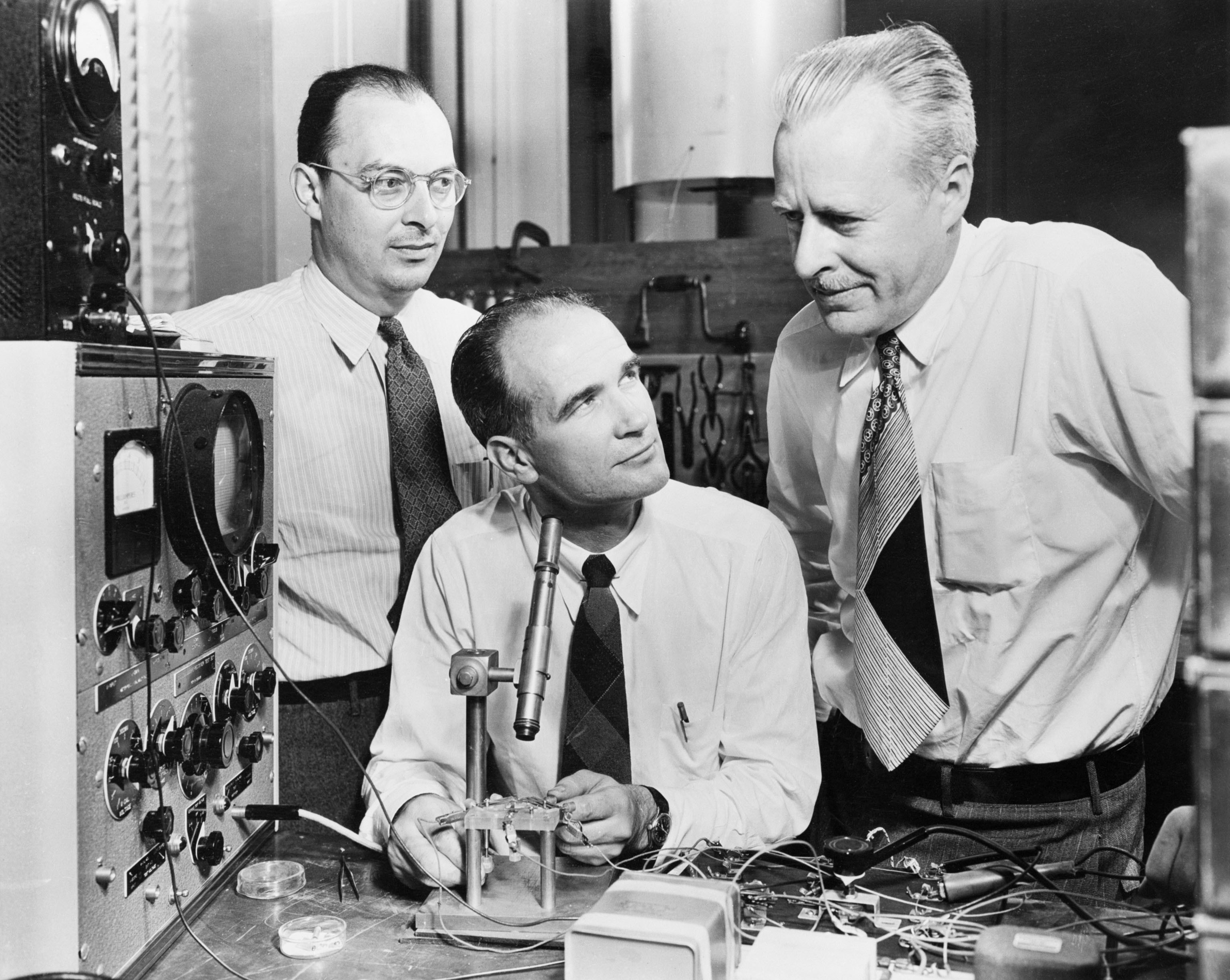
John Bardeen, William Shockley and Walter Brattain at Bell Labs, 1948

The Bell Lab's work on the transistor emerged from war-time efforts to produce extremely pure germanium "crystal" mixer diodes, used in radar units as a frequency mixer element in microwave radar receivers. A parallel project on germanium diodes at Purdue University succeeded in producing the good-quality germanium semiconducting crystals that were used at Bell Labs. Early tube-based circuits did not switch fast enough for this role, leading the Bell team to use solid-state diodes instead.

After the war, Shockley decided to attempt the building of a triode-like semiconductor device. He secured funding and lab space, and went to work on the problem with Bardeen and Brattain. John Bardeen eventually developed a new branch of quantum mechanics known as surface physics to account for the "odd" behavior they saw, and Bardeen and Walter Brattain eventually succeeded in building a working device.

The key to the development of the transistor was the further understanding of the process of the electron mobility in a semiconductor. It was realized that if there was some way to control the flow of the electrons from the emitter to the collector of this newly discovered diode (discovered 1874; patented 1906), one could build an amplifier. For instance, if one placed contacts on either side of a single type of crystal, the current would not flow through it. However, if a third contact could then "inject" electrons or holes into the material, the current would flow.

Actually doing this appeared to be very difficult. If the crystal were of any reasonable size, the number of electrons (or holes) required to be injected would have to be very large, making it less useful as an amplifier because it would require a large injection current to start with. That said, the whole idea of the crystal diode was that the crystal itself could provide the electrons over a very small distance, the depletion region. The key appeared to be to place the input and output contacts very close together on the surface of the crystal on either side of this region.

Brattain started working on building such a device, and tantalizing hints of amplification continued to appear as the team worked on the problem. Sometimes the system would work, but then stop working unexpectedly. In one instance a non-working system started working when placed in water. The electrons in any one piece of the crystal would migrate about due to nearby charges. Electrons in the emitters, or the "holes" in the collectors, would cluster at the surface of the crystal, where they could find their opposite charge "floating around" in the air (or water). Yet they could be pushed away from the surface with the application of a small amount of charge from any other location on the crystal. Instead of needing a large supply of injected electrons, a very small number in the right place on the crystal would accomplish the same thing.

Their understanding solved the problem of needing a very small control area to some degree. Instead of needing two separate semiconductors connected by a common, but tiny, region, a single larger surface would serve. The emitter and collector leads would both be placed very close together on the top, with the control lead placed on the base of the crystal. When current was applied to the "base" lead, the electrons or holes would be pushed out, across the block of semiconductor, and collect on the far surface. As long as the emitter and collector were very close together, this should allow enough electrons or holes between them to allow conduction to start.

An early witness of the phenomenon was Ralph Bray, a young graduate student. He joined the germanium effort at Purdue University in November 1943 and was given the tricky task of measuring the spreading resistance at the metal–semiconductor contact. Bray found a great many anomalies, such as internal high-resistivity barriers in some samples of germanium. The most curious phenomenon was the exceptionally low resistance observed when voltage pulses were applied. This effect remained a mystery because nobody realised, until 1948, that Bray had observed minority-carrier injection – the effect that was identified by William Shockley at Bell Labs and made the transistor a reality.

Bray wrote: "That was the one aspect that we missed, but even had we understood the idea of minority carrier injection... we would have said, 'Oh, this explains our effects.' We might not necessarily have gone ahead and said, 'Let's start making transistors,' open up a factory and sell them... At that time the important device was the high back voltage rectifier".

Shockley's research team initially attempted to build a field-effect transistor (FET), by trying to modulate the conductivity of a semiconductor, but was unsuccessful, mainly due to problems with the surface states, the dangling bond, and the germanium and copper compound materials. In the course of trying to understand the mysterious reasons behind their failure to build a working FET, this led them to instead inventing the bipolar point-contact and junction transistors.

== First working transistor ==
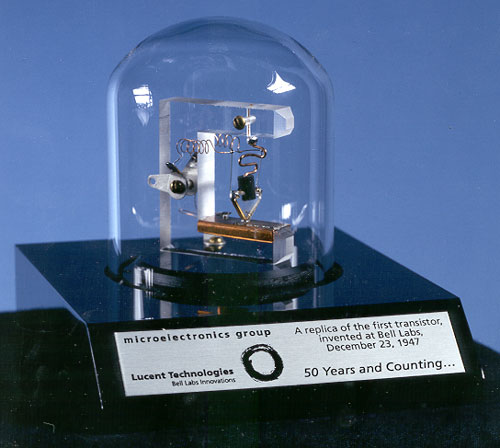
A stylized replica of the first transistor

The Bell team made many attempts to build such a system with various tools, but generally failed. Setups where the contacts were close enough were invariably as fragile as the original cat's whisker detectors had been, and would only work briefly, if at all. Eventually they had a practical breakthrough. A piece of gold foil was glued to the edge of a triangular plastic wedge, and then the foil was sliced with a razor at the tip of the triangle. The result was two very closely spaced contacts of gold. When the plastic was pushed down onto the surface of a crystal and voltage applied to the other side (on the base of the crystal), current started to flow from one contact to the other as the base voltage pushed the electrons away from the base towards the other side near the contacts. The point-contact transistor had been invented.

From Walter Brattain's laboratory notebook entry of December 15, 1947, "When the points were very close together got voltage amp about 2 but not power amp. This voltage amplification was independent of frequency 10 to 10,000 cycles".

And in the December 16, 1947 notes, "Using this double point contact, contact was made to a germanium surface that had been anodized to 90 volts, electrolyte washed off in H_{2}O and then had some gold spots evaporated on it. The gold contacts were pressed down on the bare surface. Both gold contacts to the surface rectified nicely... The separation between points was about 4 × 10^{−3} cm. One point was used as a grid and the other point as a plate. The bias (D.C.) on the grid had to be positive to get amplification... power gain 1.3 voltage gain 15 on a plate bias of about 15 volts".

Brattain and H. R. Moore made a demonstration to several of their colleagues and managers at Bell Labs on the afternoon of December 23, 1947, often given as the birth date of the transistor. The "PNP point-contact germanium transistor" operated as a speech amplifier with a power gain of 18 in that trial. In 1956 John Bardeen, Walter Houser Brattain, and William Bradford Shockley were honored with the Nobel Prize in Physics "for their researches on semiconductors and their discovery of the transistor effect".

Twelve people are mentioned as directly involved in the invention of the transistor in the Bell Laboratory.

At the same time some European scientists were led by the idea of solid-state amplifiers. The German physicist Herbert F. Mataré (1912–2011) had conducted experiments at Telefunken with what he called "Duodiode" (double diode) from 1942, when he first observed transconductance effects with silicon diodes manufactured for German radar equipment for WWII. Finally on August 13, 1948, Mataré and Heinrich Welker (1912–1981), working at Compagnie des Freins et Signaux Westinghouse in Aulnay-sous-Bois, France applied for a patent on an amplifier based on the minority carrier injection process which they called the "Transistron". The device was shown publicly on May 18, 1949. Transistrons were commercially manufactured for the French telephone company and military, and in 1953 a solid-state radio receiver with four transistrons was demonstrated at the Düsseldorf Radio Fair.

As Bell Labs did not make a public announcement of their transistor before June 1948, the transistron was an independent parallel discovery and development.

== Etymology ==
Bell Telephone Laboratories needed a generic name for the new invention: "Semiconductor Triode", "Surface States Triode", "Crystal Triode", "Solid Triode" and "Iotatron" were all considered, but "Transistor," coined by John R. Pierce, was the clear winner of an internal ballot (owing in part to the affinity that Bell engineers had developed for the suffix "-istor"). The rationale for the name is described in the following extract from the company's Technical Memorandum calling for votes:

Transistor. This is an abbreviated combination of the words "transconductance" or "transfer", and "varistor". The device logically belongs in the varistor family, and has the transconductance or transfer impedance of a device having gain, so that this combination is descriptive.

— Bell Telephone Laboratories — Technical Memorandum (May 28, 1948)

Pierce recalled the naming somewhat differently:

The way I provided the name, was to think of what the device did. And at that time, it was supposed to be the dual of the vacuum tube. The vacuum tube had transconductance, so the transistor would have 'transresistance.' And the name should fit in with the names of other devices, such as varistor and thermistor. And. . . I suggested the name 'transistor.'

— John R. Pierce, interviewed for PBS show "Transistorized!"

The Nobel Foundation states that the term is a combination of the words "transfer" and "resistor".

== Early conflict ==
Shockley was shocked about the device being credited to Brattain and Bardeen, who he felt had built it "behind his back" to take the glory. Matters became worse when Bell Labs lawyers found that some of Shockley's own writings on the transistor were close enough to those of an earlier 1925 patent by Julius Edgar Lilienfeld that they thought it best that his name be left off the patent application.

== Improvements in transistor design ==
=== Switch to silicon ===
Germanium was difficult to purify and had a limited operational temperature range. Scientists theorized that silicon would be easier to fabricate, but few bothered to investigate this possibility. Morris Tanenbaum et al. at Bell Laboratories were the first to develop a working silicon transistor on January 26, 1954. A few months later, Gordon Teal, working independently at Texas Instruments, developed a similar device. Both of these devices were made by controlling the doping of single silicon crystals while they were grown from molten silicon. A superior method was developed by Morris Tanenbaum and Calvin S. Fuller at Bell Laboratories in early 1955 by the gaseous diffusion of donor and acceptor impurities into single crystal silicon chips.

Up until the late 1950s, however, germanium remained the dominant semiconductor material for transistors and other semiconductor devices. Germanium was initially considered the more effective semiconductor material, as it was able to demonstrate better performance due to higher carrier mobility. The relative lack of performance in early silicon semiconductors was due to electrical conductivity being limited by unstable quantum surface states, preventing electricity from reliably penetrating the surface to reach the semiconducting silicon layer.

== Silicon surface passivation ==
Surface passivation, the process by which a semiconductor surface is rendered inert, and does not change semiconductor properties as a result of interaction with air or other materials in contact with the surface or edge of the crystal, was first discovered by Carl Frosch and Lincoln Derrick at Bell Labs between 1955 and 1957. Frosch and Derrick showed that a silicon dioxide (SiO_{2}) layer protected silicon wafers against the environment, masked against dopant diffusion into silicon and electrically insulated and demonstrated it by creating the first silicon dioxide transistors, the first transistors in which drain and source were adjacent at the surface insulated by a SiO_{2} layer.

=== Planar process ===
Jean Hoerni was aware of the work done by Frosch and Derick at Bell Labs. Later, Hoerni attended a meeting where Atalla presented a paper about passivation based on the previous results at Bell Labs. Taking advantage of silicon dioxide's passivating effect on the silicon surface, Hoerni proposed to make transistors that were protected by a layer of silicon dioxide and issued a first patent in 1959, while working at Fairchild Semiconductor.

=== MOSFET ===
In 1959, the MOSFET was introduced. In 2020, it was still the dominant transistor type in use, with an estimated total of 13 sextillion (1.3×10^{22}) MOSFETs manufactured between 1960 and 2018. The key advantages of a MOSFET transistors over BJTs are that they consume no current except when switching states and they have faster switching speed (ideal for digital signals).

== Early commercialization ==
The world's first commercial transistor production line was at the Western Electric plant on Union Boulevard in Allentown, Pennsylvania. Production began on Oct. 1, 1951 with the point contact germanium transistor.

The first commercial application of transistors in telecommunication was in the Fall of 1952 in tone generators for multifrequency signaling of the No. 5 Crossbar switching system in the Englewood, NJ installation, used for the first field trial of direct distance dialing (DDD).

By 1953, the transistor was being used in some products, such as hearing aids and telephone exchanges, but there were still significant issues preventing its broader application, such as sensitivity to moisture and the fragility of the wires attached to germanium crystals. Donald G. Fink, Philco's director of research, summarized the status of the transistor's commercial potential with an analogy: "Is it a pimpled adolescent, now awkward, but promising future vigor? Or has it arrived at maturity, full of languor, surrounded by disappointments?"

Semiconductor companies initially focused on junction transistors in the early years of the semiconductor industry. However, the junction transistor was a relatively bulky device that was difficult to manufacture on a mass-production basis, which limited it to a number of specialised applications.

=== Transistor radios ===
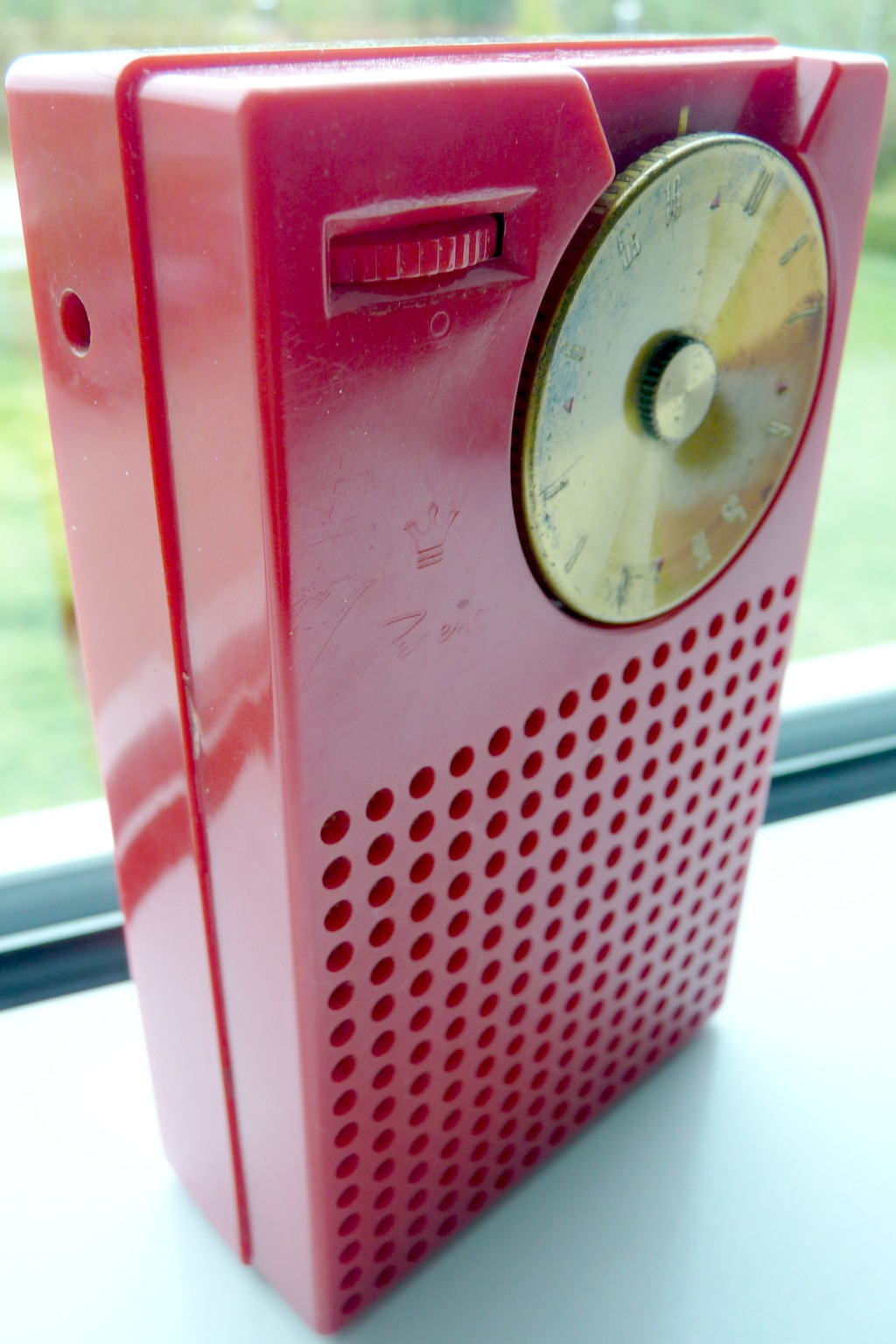
The Regency TR-1 which used Texas Instruments' NPN transistors, was the world's first commercially produced transistor radio.

Prototypes of all-transistor AM radio receivers were demonstrated, but were really only laboratory curiosities. However, in 1950 Shockley developed a radically different type of solid-state amplifier which became known as the bipolar junction transistor, which works on a completely different principle than the point-contact transistor. Morgan Sparks made the bipolar junction transistor into a practical device. These were also licensed to a number of other electronics companies, including Texas Instruments, who produced a limited run of transistor radios as a sales tool. Early transistors were chemically unstable and only suitable for low-power, low-frequency applications, but as transistor design developed, these problems were slowly overcome.

There are numerous claimants to the title of the first company to produce practical transistor radios. Texas Instruments had demonstrated all-transistor AM radios as early as 1952, but their performance was well below that of equivalent vacuum tube models. A workable all-transistor radio was demonstrated in August 1953 at the Düsseldorf Radio Fair by the German firm Intermetall. It was built with four of Intermetall's hand-made transistors, based upon the 1948 invention of Herbert Mataré and Heinrich Welker. However, as with the early Texas units (and others) only prototypes were ever built; it was never put into commercial production.

The Regency TR-1, developed as a joint venture between Texas Instruments and the Regency Division of I.D.E.A. (Industrial Development Engineering Associates), was the first transistor radio available to U.S. consumers. It reached U.S. stores in October 1954 at a price of US$49.95 and sold more than 100,000 units.

The TR-1 used four Texas Instruments NPN transistors and had to be powered by a 22.5-volt battery, since the only way to get adequate radio frequency performance out of early transistors was to run them close to their collector-to-emitter breakdown voltage. This made the TR-1 very expensive to run, and it was far more popular for its novelty or status value than its actual performance, rather in the fashion of the first MP3 players.

Still, aside from its indifferent performance, the TR-1 was a very advanced product for its time, using printed circuit boards, and what were then considered micro-miniature components.

Masaru Ibuka, co-founder of the Japanese firm Sony, was visiting the United States when Bell Labs announced the availability of manufacturing licenses, including detailed instructions on how to manufacture junction transistors. Ibuka obtained special permission from the Japanese Ministry of Finance to pay the $50,000 license fee, and in 1955 the company introduced their own five-transistor "coatpocket" radio, the TR-55, under the new brand name Sony. This product was soon followed by more ambitious designs, but it is generally regarded as marking the commencement of Sony's growth into a manufacturing superpower.

The TR-55 was quite similar to the Regency TR-1 in many ways, being powered by the same sort of 22.5-volt battery, and was not much more practical. Note: according to the schematic, the TR-55 used a 6 volt supply. Very few were distributed outside Japan. It was not until 1957 that Sony produced their ground-breaking "TR-63" shirt pocket radio, a much more advanced design that ran on a standard 9-volt battery and could compete favorably with vacuum tube portables. The TR-63 was also the first transistor radio to use all miniature components. (The term "pocket" was a matter of some interpretation, as Sony allegedly had special shirts made with oversized pockets for their salesmen.)

1955 Chrysler–Philco all transistor car radio – "Breaking News" radio broadcast announcement

In the April 28th 1955 edition of the Wall Street Journal, Chrysler and Philco announced that they had developed and produced the world's first all-transistor car radio. Chrysler made the all-transistor car radio, Mopar model 914HR, available as an "option" in Fall 1955 for its new line of 1956 Chrysler and Imperial cars, which hit the showroom floor on October 21, 1955. The all-transistor car radio was a $150 option.

The Sony TR-63, released in 1957, was the first mass-produced transistor radio, leading to the mass-market penetration of transistor radios. The TR-63 went on to sell seven million units worldwide by the mid-1960s. With the visible success of the TR-63, Japanese competitors such as Toshiba and Sharp Corporation joined the market. Sony's success with transistor radios led to transistors replacing vacuum tubes as the dominant electronic technology in the late 1950s.

=== Hobby use ===
The first low-cost junction transistor available to the general public was the CK722, a PNP germanium small signal unit introduced by Raytheon in early 1953 for $7.60 each. In the 1950s and 1960s, hundreds of hobbyist electronics projects based around the CK722 transistor were published in popular books and magazines. Raytheon also participated in expanding the role of the CK722 as a hobbyist electronics device by publishing "Transistor Applications" and "Transistor Applications- Volume 2" during the mid-1950s.

=== Transistor computers ===
The world's first transistor computer was built at the University of Manchester in November 1953. The computer was built by Richard Grimsdale, then a research student in the Department of Electrical Engineering and later a professor of Electronic Engineering at Sussex University. The machine used point-contact transistors, made in small quantities by STC and Mullard. These consisted of a single crystal of germanium with two fine wires, resembling the crystal and cat's whisker of the 1920s. These transistors had the useful property that a single transistor could possess two stable states... The development of the machine was severely hampered by the unreliability of the transistors. It consumed 150 watts.

Metropolitan Vickers Ltd rebuilt the full 200 transistor (& 1300 diode) design in 1956 using junction transistors (for internal use).

The IBM 7070 (1958), IBM 7090 (1959), and CDC 1604 (1960) were the first computers (as products for sale) based on transistors.

== MOSFET (MOS transistor) ==
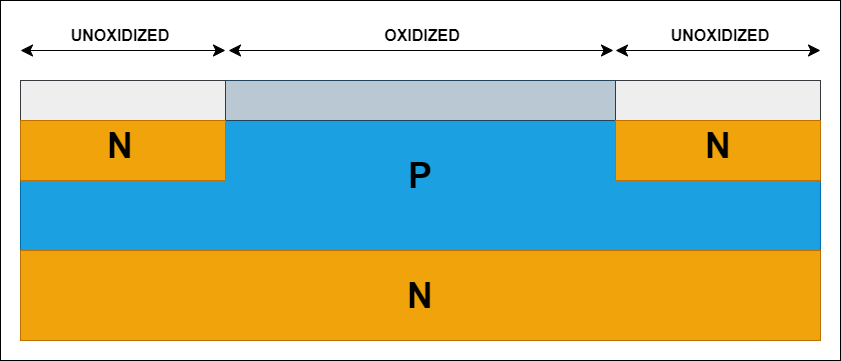
1957, Diagram of one of the transistor devices made by Frosch and Derrick

In 1955, Carl Frosch and Lincoln Derick accidentally grew a layer of silicon dioxide over the silicon wafer, for which they observed surface passivation effects. By 1957 Frosch and Derick, using masking and predeposition, were able to manufacture the first planar transistors, in which drain and source were adjacent at the same surface.

Following this research, Mohamed Atalla and Dawon Kahng proposed a silicon MOS transistor in 1959 and successfully demonstrated a working MOS device with their Bell Labs team in 1960. Their team included E. E. LaBate and E. I. Povilonis who fabricated the device; M. O. Thurston, L. A. D’Asaro, and J. R. Ligenza who developed the diffusion processes, and H. K. Gummel and R. Lindner who characterized the device.

With its high scalability, and much lower power consumption and higher density than bipolar junction transistors, the MOSFET made it possible to build high-density integrated circuits (ICs), allowing the integration of more than 10,000 transistors in a single IC.

The first gallium-arsenide Schottky-gate field-effect transistor (MESFET) was made by Carver Mead and reported in 1966. The first report of a floating-gate MOSFET (FGMOS) was made by Dawon Kahng and Simon Sze in 1967.

The MOSFET has since become the most widely manufactured device in history. As of 2018, an estimated total of 13 sextillion MOS transistors have been manufactured.

=== PMOS and NMOS ===
There were originally two types of MOSFET logic, PMOS (p-type MOS) and NMOS (n-type MOS). Both types were developed by Frosch and Derrick in 1957 at Bell Labs.

=== CMOS ===
In 1948, Bardeen and Brattain patented at Bell Labs an insulated-gate transistor (IGFET) with an inversion layer, this concept forms the basis of CMOS technology today. A new type of MOSFET logic, CMOS (complementary MOS), was invented by Chih-Tang Sah and Frank Wanlass at Fairchild Semiconductor, and in February 1963 they published the invention in a research paper.

=== Self-aligned gate ===
The self-aligned gate (silicon-gate) MOSFET transistor was invented by Robert Kerwin, Donald Klein and John Sarace at Bell Labs in 1967. Fairchild Semiconductor researchers Federico Faggin and Tom Klein later used self-aligned gate MOSFETs to develop the first silicon-gate MOS integrated circuit.

== MOSFET commercialization ==
The MOSFET, also known as the MOS transistor, was the first truly compact transistor that could be miniaturised and mass-produced for a wide range of uses. It revolutionized the wider electronics industry, including power electronics, consumer electronics, control systems, and computers. The MOSFET has since become the most common type of transistor in the world, with uses including computers, electronics, and communications technology (such as smartphones). The MOS transistor has been described as the "workhorse of the electronics industry" due to being the building block of every microprocessor, memory chip and telecommunication circuit in use. Billions of MOS transistors are manufactured every day, as of 2013.

=== Integrated circuits ===
General Microelectronics introduced the first commercial MOS integrated circuits in 1964, consisting of 120 p-channel transistors. It was a 20-bit shift register, developed by Robert Norman and Frank Wanlass. In 1967, Bell Labs researchers Robert Kerwin, Donald Klein and John Sarace developed the self-aligned gate (silicon-gate) MOS transistor, which Fairchild Semiconductor researchers Federico Faggin and Tom Klein used to develop the first silicon-gate MOS IC.

By 1972, MOS LSI (large-scale integration) circuits were commercialized for numerous applications, including automobiles, trucks, home appliances, business machines, electronic musical instruments, computer peripherals, cash registers, calculators, data transmission and telecommunication equipment.

=== Semiconductor memory ===
The first modern memory cells were introduced in 1965, when John Schmidt designed the first 64-bit MOS SRAM (static RAM). In 1967, Robert H. Dennard of IBM filed a patent for a single-transistor DRAM (dynamic RAM) memory cell, using a MOSFET.

The earliest practical application of floating-gate MOSFET (FGMOS) was floating-gate memory cells, which Dawon Kahng and Simon Sze proposed could be used to produce reprogrammable ROM (read-only memory). Floating-gate memory cells later became the basis for non-volatile memory (NVM) technologies including EPROM (erasable programmable ROM), EEPROM (electrically erasable programmable ROM) and flash memory.

=== Microprocessors ===
The MOSFET is the basis of every microprocessor. The earliest microprocessors were all MOS microprocessors, built with MOS LSI circuits. The first multi-chip microprocessors, the Four-Phase Systems AL1 in 1969 and the Garrett AiResearch MP944 in 1970, were developed with multiple MOS LSI chips. The first commercial single-chip microprocessor, the Intel 4004, was developed by Federico Faggin, using his silicon-gate MOS IC technology, with Intel engineers Marcian Hoff and Stan Mazor, and Busicom engineer Masatoshi Shima. With the arrival of CMOS microprocessors in 1975, the term "MOS microprocessors" began to refer to chips fabricated entirely from PMOS logic or fabricated entirely from NMOS logic, contrasted with "CMOS microprocessors" and "bipolar bit-slice processors".

=== Pocket calculators ===
One of the earliest influential consumer electronic products enabled by MOS transistors was the electronic pocket calculator. In 1965, the Victor 3900 desktop calculator was the first MOS LSI calculator, with 29 MOS LSI chips. In 1967 the Texas Instruments Cal-Tech was the first prototype electronic handheld calculator, with three MOS LSI chips, and it was later released as the Canon Pocketronic in 1970. The Sharp QT-8D desktop calculator was the first mass-produced LSI MOS calculator in 1969, and the Sharp EL-8 which used four MOS LSI chips was the first commercial electronic handheld calculator in 1970. The first true electronic pocket calculator was the Busicom LE-120A HANDY LE, which used a single MOS LSI calculator-on-a-chip from Mostek, and was released in 1971.

=== Personal computers ===
In the 1970s, the MOS microprocessor was the basis for home computers, microcomputers (micros) and personal computers (PCs). This led to the start of what is known as the personal computer revolution or microcomputer revolution.

=== Power electronics ===
The power MOSFET is the most widely used power device in the world. Advantages over bipolar junction transistors in power electronics include MOSFETs not requiring a continuous flow of drive current to remain in the ON state, offering higher switching speeds, lower switching power losses, lower on-resistances, and reduced susceptibility to thermal runaway. The power MOSFET had an impact on power supplies, enabling higher operating frequencies, size and weight reduction, and increased volume production.

The power MOSFET, which is commonly used in power electronics, was developed in the early 1970s. The power MOSFET enables low gate drive power, fast switching speed, and advanced paralleling capability.

=== Sustainable transistors ===
In late April 2023, researchers at Linköping University and KTH Royal Institute of Technology successfully developed the world's first wooden transistor, potentially paving the way for more sustainable electronics and even the control of electronic plants, according to an article on Hackster.io. The team created a functional transistor to switch electronic signals using cellulose-based electrolyte and lignin-derived organic semiconductors. This breakthrough could lead to further research in creating environmentally friendly electronic devices and exploring the possibility of integrating electronics into living plants for monitoring and control purposes.

== Patents ==
- US 1745175 Julius Edgar Lilienfeld: "Method and apparatus for controlling electric current" first filed in Canada on 1925-10-22, describing a field-effect transistor
- US 1900018 Julius Edgar Lilienfeld: "Device for controlling electric current" filed on 1928-03-28, a thin film field-effect transistor
- GB 439457 Oskar Heil: "Improvements in or relating to electrical amplifiers and other control arrangements and devices" first filed in Germany on 1934-03-02
- US 2524035 John Bardeen et al.: "Three-electrode circuit element utilizing semiconductive materials" oldest priority 1948-02-26
- US 2569347 William Shockley: "Circuit element utilizing semiconductive material" oldest priority 1948-06-26
- US 3206670 Mohamed Atalla: "Semiconductor devices having dielectric coatings" filed in 1960-08-03, describing a MOSFET
- US 3102230 Dawon Kahng: "Electric field controlled semiconductor device" filed in 1960-08-03, describing a MOSFET

== See also ==
- Semiconductor industry in the United States

== Books and literature ==
- Gertner, John (2012). The Idea Factory: Bell Labs and the Great Age of American Innovation. Penguin Books. ISBN 978-0-14-312279-1. A history of Bell Laboratories and its technological innovations
- Riordan, Michael; Hoddeson, Lillian (1998). Crystal Fire. W.W Norton & Company Limited. ISBN 978-0-393-31851-7. The invention of the transistor & the birth of the information age
- Kai Handel (June 29, 1999). "Anfänge der Halbleiterforschung und -entwicklung. Dargestellt an den Biographien von vier deutschen Halbleiterpionieren". PhD Thesis RWTH Aachen.
- Out of the Crystal Maze Chapters from The History of Solid State Physics (728s)
- Electronic Genie: THE TANGLED HISTORY OF SILICON (304s)
- The INVENTION THAT CHANGED THE WORLD: HOW A SMALL GROUP OF RADAR PIONEERS WON THE SECOND WORLD WAR AND LAUNCHED A TECH (576s)
