= Morgan Sparks =

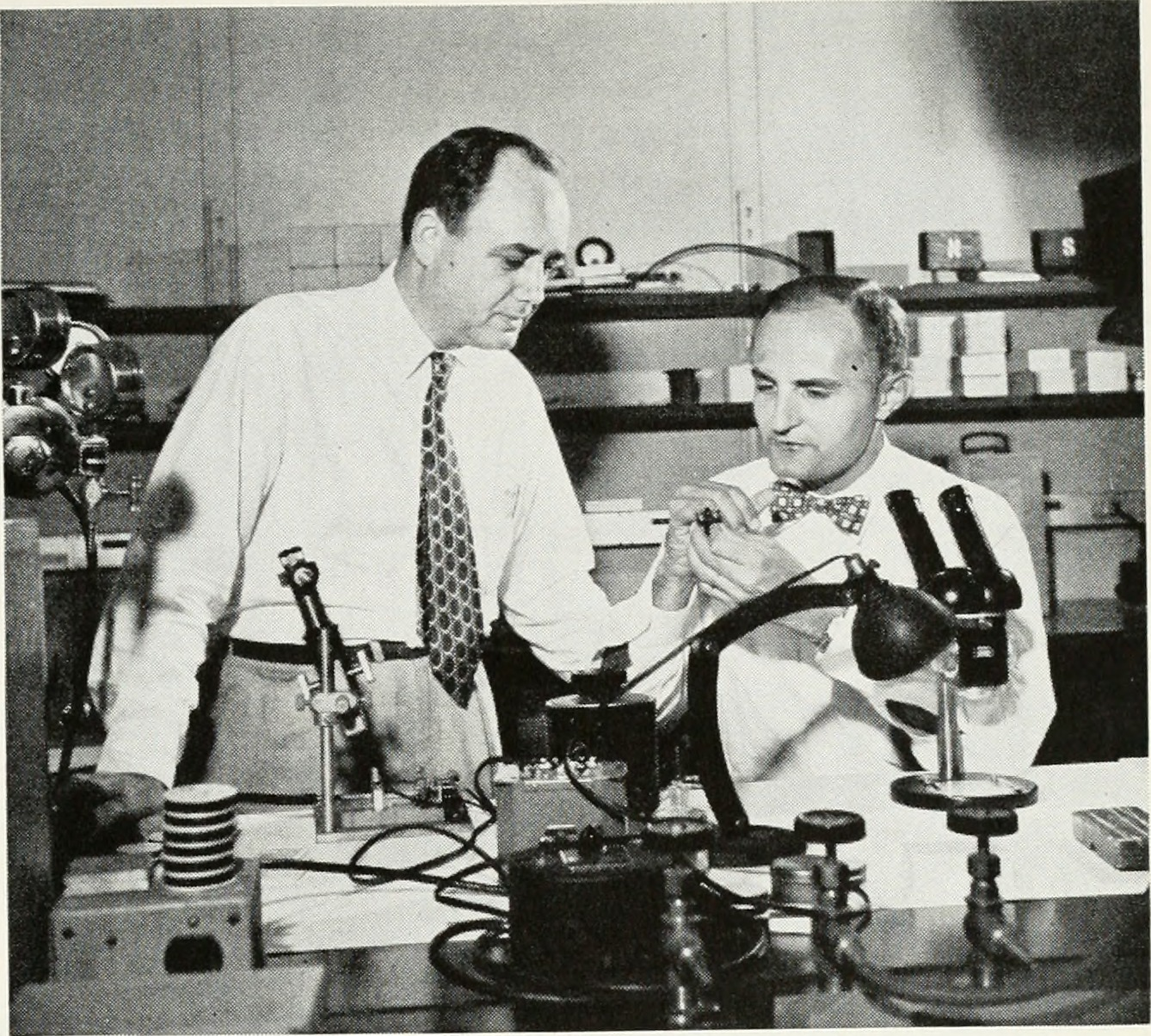
Morgan Sparks (r) with Gordon K. Teal in 1953

Morgan Sparks (July 6, 1916 – May 3, 2008) was an American scientist and engineer who developed the microwatt bipolar junction transistor in 1951, which was a critical step in making transistors usable for every-day electronics. Sparks directed Sandia National Laboratories.

== Early life and education ==
Sparks was born in Pagosa Springs, Colorado and earned his BA and MA degrees, both in chemistry, at Rice University. He then did his PhD work in physical chemistry at the University of Illinois, Urbana.

== Career ==
Sparks went on to work at Bell Labs where John Bardeen, Walter Brattain and William Shockley were developing the first transistor. Sparks stayed at Bell Labs and worked there to develop the microwatt bipolar junction transistor which helped make transistors practical enough for common use. Later, Sparks left Bell Labs to become the director of Sandia National Laboratories.

== See also ==
- History of the transistor
