= Herbert Mataré =

German physicist (1912-2011)

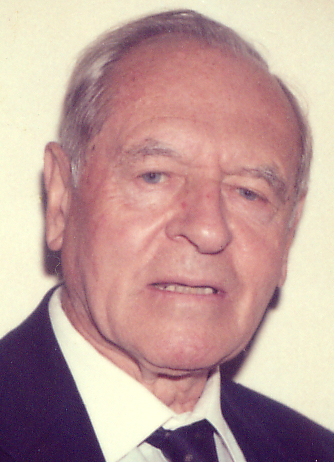
Herbert F. Mataré in 1990

Herbert Franz Mataré (22 September 1912 – 2 September 2011) was a German physicist. The focus of his research was the field of semiconductor research. His best-known work is the first functional European transistor, which he developed and patented together with Heinrich Welker in the vicinity of Paris in 1948, independent from the Bell Labs engineers who had developed the first transistor shortly before.

== Biography ==
Born in Aachen, Mataré studied mathematics, chemistry, electrochemistry, nuclear physics, and solid-state physics at the Technical University of Aachen, and received the degree "Diplom-Ingenieur" in Applied Physics. In addition, he studied mathematics, physics, and chemistry at the University of Geneva.

In 1939 he joined the Telefunken research laboratory in Berlin. At that time it became obvious that the miniaturization of vacuum tubes had met a technical limit and that alternative solutions had to be sought using solid state circuits and the principles of the earlier transistor inventions of Julius Edgar Lilienfeld, Oskar Heil, Walter Schottky, and Robert Wichard Pohl.

Because of the air raids on Berlin in 1943, the Telefunken laboratory was moved to the Cistercian abbey in Lubiąż (Leubus) Silesia, where Mataré focused on improving cm-wave (SHF) receiver sensitivity. In 1944, as the Soviet army closed in, the site and most of its equipment were abandoned and the operation was transferred to Thuringia.

Later Mataré taught physics and mathematics in Wabern near Kassel and gave lectures at RWTH Aachen. He was also hired by Compagnie des Freins et Signaux Westinghouse to build a semiconductor diode plant in Aulnay-sous-Bois near Paris.

During the final 20 years of his life, Mataré split time between his homes in Hückelhoven, Germany, and Malibu, California.

== Academic degrees ==
1933	BS	Physics, Mathematics, and Chemistry	Technische Hochschule Aachen; University of Geneva
1939	MS (Dipl.-Ing.)	Physics	Technische Hochschule Aachen
1942	PhD (Dr.-Ing.)	Electronics	Technische Hochschule Berlin
1950	PhD (Dr. sc. phys)	Solid State Physics	École Normale Supérieure (ENS), Paris

== Important work ==
Independently of American work, the German researchers Mataré and Heinrich Welker developed the first operational French transistor at Compagnie des Freins et Signaux Westinghouse in Aulnay-sous-Bois near Paris during the years 1945 to 1948. They filed their first transistor patent application on 13 August 1948. This European invention was presented to the public on 18 May 1949 as the "Le Transistron".

In 1951/1952, Mataré founded Intermetall in Düsseldorf, the first company to offer diodes and transistors.

== Controversial views ==
Mataré contributed articles to the scientific racist journal Mankind Quarterly. In his book Conscientious Evolution (1982) he discussed a broad range of topics including genetic engineering, eugenic measures, controlled procreation, sterilization, and capital punishment. Matare's ill-advised articles and text were poorly formulated and lacking in scientific basis. The anthropologist H. James Birx described the book as deeply prejudiced, "neither a careful examination of the promise of human genetics nor a contribution to the science of organic evolution."

== Awards (selection) ==
- Life Fellow IEEE
- Member emeritus New York Academy of Sciences
- Eduard Rhein Ring of Honor, Eduard Rhein Foundation, 2008.

== Literature ==
- H. F. Mataré (April 2001). "Erlebnisse eines deutschen Physikers und Ingenieurs von 1912 bis Ende des Jahrhunderts". Der Fernmelde-Ingenieur. 4/01, 5/01 (in one volume): 1–109. ISSN 0015-010X.
- H. F. Mataré (September 2002). "Von der Radartechnik zur modernen Kommunikationstechnik". Tele-Kommunikation Aktuell. 9/02, 10/02 (in one volume): 1–59. ISSN 1619-2036.
- Kai Handel (1999-06-29). "Anfänge der Halbleiterforschung und -entwicklung. Dargestellt an den Biographien von vier deutschen Halbleiterpionieren" (PDF). PhD Thesis RWTH Aachen. Archived from the original (PDF) on 2008-10-30.
- Armand Van Dormael (2009). "Biographies: Herbert F. Mataré". IEEE Annals of the History of Computing. 31 (3): 68–73. doi:10.1109/MAHC.2009.38.

== Patents ==
The following list can only present a part of the more than 80 patents which Mataré has filed.

- US 2552052 H. F. Mataré: „Push-pull converter of the crystal type for ultra-short waves“ filed in France on May 23, 1947
- FR 1010427 H. F. Mataré/H. Welker/Westinghouse: „Nouveau système cristallin à plusieurs électrodes réalisant des effects de relais électroniques“ filed on August 13, 1948
- US 2673948 H. F. Mataré/H. Welker/Westinghouse: „Crystal device for controlling electric currents by means of a solid semiconductor“ french priority date August 13, 1948
