= Gordon Kidd Teal =

American inventor (1907–2003)

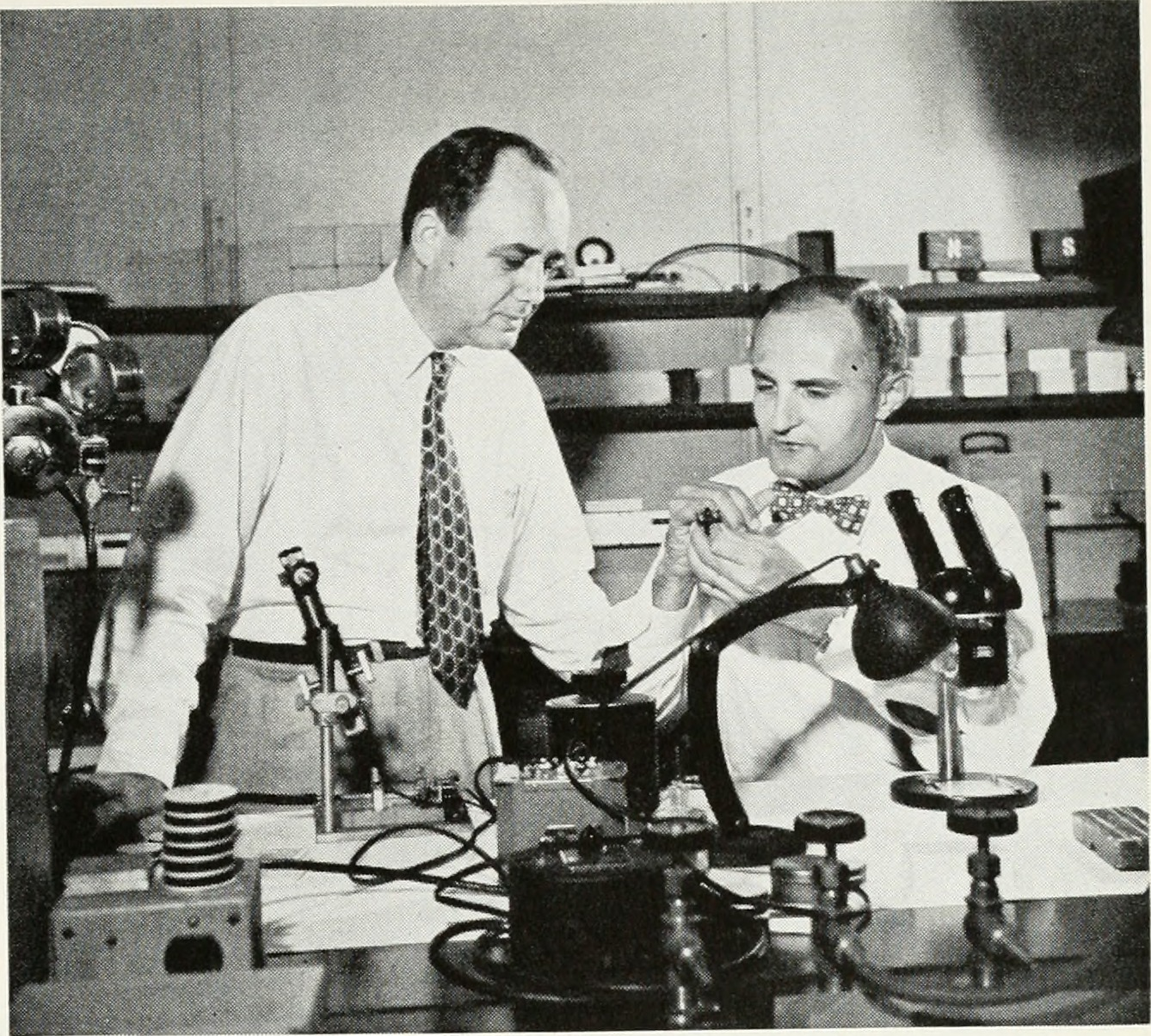
- Gordon K. Teal (l) with Morgan Sparks in 1953
- Born: January 10, 1907; South Dallas, Texas
- Died: January 7, 2003 (aged 95); Dallas, Texas
- Education: Brown University; Baylor University
- Known for: silicon transistor
- Awards: IEEE Medal of Honor (1968)
- Scientific career
- Fields: Electrical engineering
- Workplaces: Bell Labs; Texas Instruments; NIST
- Thesis: A Study of Sodium Germanyl and Potassium Germanyl (1931)

Gordon Kidd Teal (January 10, 1907 – January 7, 2003) was an American engineer. He invented a method of applying the Czochralski method to produce extremely pure germanium single crystals used in making greatly improved transistors. He, together with Morgan Sparks, invented a modification of the process that produced the configuration necessary for the fabrication of bipolar junction transistors. He is most remembered for developing the first silicon transistor while at Texas Instruments.

== Early life and education ==
Teal was born in South Dallas, Texas to Olin Allison Teal and Azelia Kidd. His father had come to Texas in 1897 from Georgia. Gordon was valedictorian at the Bryan Street High School in Dallas, Texas, and graduated in 1924. Gordon earned his B.A. in Mathematics and Chemistry from Baylor University in 1927 and his master's and Ph.D. in Physical Chemistry from Brown University in 1928 and 1931, respectively. While at Brown, he began work in the laboratory of Professor Charles Kraus on the element germanium, which was then believed to be useless.

== Bell Labs ==
Teal joined Bell Labs in 1930 and would remain employed there for 22 years. During his time there, he continued to work with germanium and silicon. When William Shockley's group at Bell Labs invented the transistor in 1947, Teal realized that substantial improvements in the device would result if it was fabricated using a single crystal, rather than the polycrystalline material then being used, and created the grown-junction single-crystal technique.

== Texas Instruments ==
In 1952 Dallas-based Texas Instruments had purchased a license to produce germanium transistors from Western Electric, the manufacturing arm of AT&T and placed an advertisement in the New York Times for a director of research. Teal, becoming homesick for his native Dallas, responded and was hired by Patrick E. Haggerty. Teal started at TI as an assistant vice president on 1 January 1953, bringing with him all his expertise in growing semiconductor crystals. Haggerty had hired him to establish a team of scientists and engineers to keep TI at the leading edge of the new and rapidly expanding semiconductor industry. Teal's first assignment was to organize what became TI's Central Research Laboratories (CRL). Because of Teal's background, this new department was modeled after Bell Labs.

=== Silicon transistor ===
In April 1954 Teal's TI CRL team created the first commercial silicon transistor and tested it on 14 April 1954. On 10 May 1954 at the Institute of Radio Engineers (IRE) National Conference on Airborne Electronics, in Dayton, Ohio, Teal revealed this achievement to the world, when he announced: "Contrary to what my colleagues have told you about the bleak prospects for silicon transistors, I happen to have a few of them here in my pocket." Teal also presented a paper "Some Recent Developments in Silicon and Germanium Materials and Devices" at this conference.

=== Other achievements ===
In 1957 Teal and the CRL developed a chemical reduction process for ultra-pure silicon. In 1958 a CRL employee Jack Kilby created the first integrated circuit. Other breakthrough developments include many advancements in infrared technology and digital signal processing, initially developed for the oil exploration industry, then for space and defense applications.

During 1963 and 1964 Teal became the International Technical Director for TI, promoting TI's growth as an international company. He resided in England, France, and Italy and was most active in their scientific and industrial aspects.

=== First Director of the Institute for Materials Research ===
In 1965, Teal, taking a leave of absence from Texas Instruments, took a role at the National Bureau of Standards (now named National Institute of Standards and Technology) to become the first director of the Institute for Materials Research in Washington, D.C. After his two-year term, he returned to Texas Instruments and remained there until he retired in 1972.

=== Retirement ===
After retiring from Texas Instruments Teal continued to work as a consultant for Texas Instruments and the Department of Defense and participate in many scientific organizations.

== Personal life ==
Teal was married to Lyda Louise Smith on March 7, 1931. The couple had three sons: Robert Carroll, Donald Fraser, and Stephen O’Banion Teal.

== Awards and honors ==
- IEEE Medal of Honor (1968)
- Golden Plate Award of the American Academy of Achievement (1967)

== Death and legacy ==
Teal died on January 7, 2003.

In May 2013, the Board of Regents of Baylor University honored Teal by naming a new residence hall the Gordon Teal Residential College.
