= Heinrich Welker =

German quantum physicist (1912-1981)

Heinrich Johann Welker
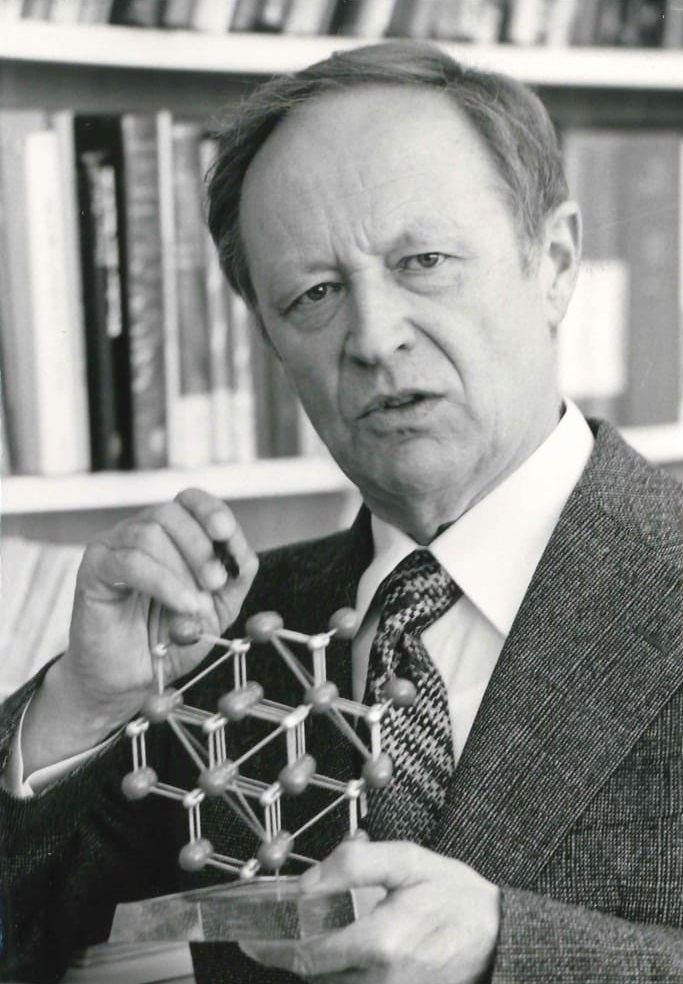
- Welker in 1970
- Born: September 12, 1912; Ingolstadt
- Died: December 25, 1981 (aged 69); Erlangen
- Education: Ludwig-Maximilians-Universität München
- Known for: JFET; Point contact transistor III-V compound semiconductors
- Awards: James C. McGroddy Prize (1975)
- Scientific career
- Workplaces: Siemens-Schuckert; Westinghouse Electric Corporation
- Doctoral advisor: Arnold Sommerfeld

Heinrich Johann Welker (9 September 1912 – 25 December 1981) was a German theoretical and applied physicist who invented the "transistron", a transistor made at Westinghouse independently of the first successful transistor made at Bell Laboratories. He did fundamental work in III-V compound semiconductors, and paved the way for microwave semiconductor elements and laser diodes.

== Biography and important work ==
Starting in 1931, Welker studied at the Ludwig-Maximilians-Universität München under Arnold Sommerfeld, and obtained a Ph.D. in 1936. The book Electrodynamics - Lectures on Theoretical Physics Volume III by Sommerfeld was based on lecture notes prepared by Welker during the winter semester of 1933/1934. Welker was granted his Habilitation under Sommerfeld in 1939.

During the war years, 1940 to 1945, Welker worked at Luftfunkforschungs Institut in Oberpfaffenhofen, but still maintained association (1942 to 1944) with the physicochemical institute of Klaus Clusius at the Ludwig-Maximilians-Universität München. After the war, from 1947 to 1951, he took a job at the Westinghouse subsidiary in Paris, Compagnie des Freins et Signaux Westinghouse. From 1951 to 1961, Welker headed of the solid-state physics department of Siemens-Schuckertwerke, in Erlangen, where he developed the new, III-V compounds such as gallium arsenide and indium antimonide, to replace silicon semiconductors. His work resulted in large-scale use of galvanomagnetic and optoelectronic effects, as well as new switching circuits in microelectronics. Welker and his department paved the way for microwave semiconductors and laser diodes. He was the director of the Erlangen Siemens-Schuckertwerke research laboratory from 1961 to 1969. From 1969, until he retired in 1977, Welker was director of all the company's research laboratories.

While at the Westinghouse subsidiary in Paris, Welker and German physicist Herbert F. Mataré developed a point contact semiconductor amplifier, demonstrated in June 1948. This coincided with the announcement by Bell laboratory scientists of the demonstration of a point contact transistor on 30 June 1948. The French Westinghouse subsidiary applied for a patent on the same type of device on 13 August 1948. On 18 May 1949, this European invention coined as the "Le Transistron" or the "French transistor" was presented to the public, while a first batch of 1,000 devices was manufactured for the French telecommunications. This development was an outgrowth of work done by the two independently in Germany in programs to develop German radar. The French patent was granted in 1952.

Welker was elected president of the Deutsche Physikalische Gesellschaft in 1977.

Siemens AG, Munich, in 1976 established the Heinrich Welker Memorial Award to honor Welker's pioneering work in III-V compound semiconductor development.

== Selected Literature ==
- Sommerfeld, A.; Welker, H. (1938). "Künstliche Grenzbedingungen beim Keplerproblem". Annalen der Physik. 424 (1–2): 56–65. Bibcode:1938AnP...424...56S. doi:10.1002/andp.19384240109. as cited in Sommerfeld Bibliography
- Arnold Sommerfeld and Heinrich Welker Über ein elektronentheoretisches Modell des Supraleiters. Mitteilung über die Arbeit., Sitzungsberichte der mathematisch-naturwissenschaftlichen Klasse der Bayerischen Akademie der Wissenschaften zu München page 5 (1938) as cited in Sommerfeld Bibliography
- Michael Riordan (November 2005). "How Europe Missed The Transistor". IEEE Spectrum. 42 (11): 52–57. doi:10.1109/MSPEC.2005.1526906. S2CID 34953819. Archived from the original on 2008-02-14.

== Patents ==
- FR 1010427 H. F. Mataré/H. Welker/Westinghouse: „Nouveau sytème cristallin à plusieurs électrodes réalisant des effects de relais électroniques“ filed on 13 August 1948
- US 2673948 H. F. Mataré/H. Welker/Westinghouse: „Crystal device for controlling electric currents by means of a solid semiconductor“ french priority date 13 August 1948
