= Lilienfeld radiation =

Electromagnetic radiation from electrons hitting metal

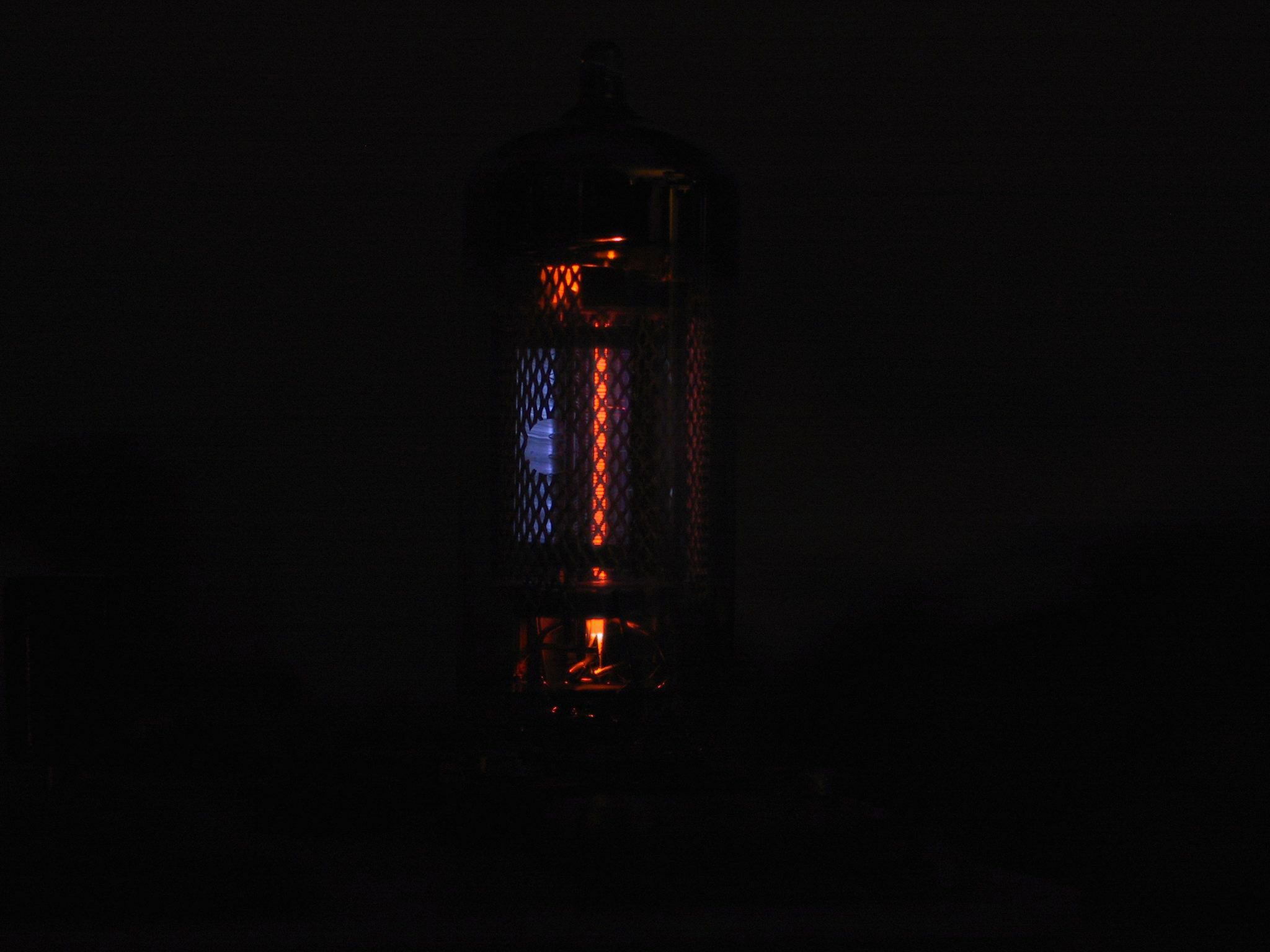
Visible Lilienfeld radiation in an Ef89 vacuum tube.

Lilienfeld radiation, named after Julius Edgar Lilienfeld, is electromagnetic radiation produced when electrons hit a metal surface.

The Smith–Purcell effect is believed to be a variant of Lilienfeld radiation.

Lilienfeld radiation is shown as Transition radiation by Vitaly Ginzburg and Ilya Frank in 1945
