= Oskar Heil =

German electrical engineer and inventor

Oskar Heil (20 March 1908, in Langwieden – 15 May 1994, San Mateo, California) was a German electrical engineer and inventor. He studied physics, chemistry, mathematics, and music at the Georg-August University of Göttingen and was awarded his PhD in 1933, for his work on molecular spectroscopy.

== Personal life ==
At the Georg-August University in Göttingen, Oskar Heil met Agnesa Arsenjewa (Агнесса Николаевна Арсеньева, 1901–1991), a promising young Russian physicist who also earned her PhD there. They married in Leningrad, the Soviet Union in 1934.

Together they moved to the United Kingdom to work in the Cavendish Laboratory, University of Cambridge. While on a trip to Italy, they co-wrote a pioneering paper on the generation of microwaves which was published in Germany in the Zeitschrift für Physik (i.e., Journal on Physics) in 1935. Agnesa subsequently returned to Russia to pursue this work further at the Leningrad Physico-Chemical Institute with her husband. However, he then returned to the UK alone; Agnesa, working in what had by then become a highly sensitive subject, was possibly not allowed to leave. Back in Britain, Oskar Heil worked for Standard Telephones and Cables.

At the onset of the Second World War he returned to Germany via Switzerland. During the war Heil worked on a microwave generator for the C. Lorenz AG in Berlin-Tempelhof.

In 1947 Heil was invited to the USA. After doing scientific work for Eitel McCullough and later the Varian Eimac division in San Carlos from 1955 until 1983, he founded his own company called Heil Scientific Labs Inc. in 1963 in Belmont, California. Agnesa remained in the Soviet Union until her death in 1991.

== Microwave vacuum tube ==
Oskar Heil and Agnesa Arsenjewa-Heil in their pioneering paper developed the concept of the velocity-modulated tube, in which a beam of electrons could be made to form into "bunches" and thereby generate with reasonable efficiency radio waves of considerably higher frequency and power than were possible with conventional vacuum tubes/thermionic valves. This resulted in production of the "Heil tube", the first truly-practicable microwave generator, which slightly predated the (independent) invention of the klystron and subsequently the reflex klystron based on the same operating principle. These devices were a significant milestone in the development of microwave technology (particularly radar), and velocity-modulated tubes are still very much in use at the present day.

== Field-effect transistor ==
Heil is mentioned as the inventor of an early transistor-like device (see also History of the transistor), based on several patents that were issued to him.

Erno Borbely states the following: "Field-effect transistors (FETs) have been around for a long time; in fact, they were invented, at least theoretically, before the bipolar transistors. The basic principle of the FET has been known since J.E. Lilienfeld’s US patent from 1930, and Oscar Heil described the possibility of controlling the resistance in a semiconducting material with an electric field in a British patent in 1935."

== Air Motion Transformer ==
He also invented the "air-motion transformer" audio speaker technology made famous by the amt1 speaker of ESS in the early 1970s.

The amt voice coil membrane is made of a polyethylene sheet, embossed with conductive aluminum strips. It is equivalent in surface area to a conventional 7-inch cone type mid-range driver, but is accordion-folded down to less than a 2-inch grouping for point-source dispersion. The low-mass membrane sheet is suspended within a quadratic magnetic housing, concentrating an intense field around the diaphragm. When signal current passes through the aluminum strips, the ensuing bellows-like motion of the folded pleats moves air five times faster than a conventional cone driver. This rapid acceleration of air-motion is claimed to provide enhanced sound reproduction, including high dynamic range and over an extremely broad frequency range.
