= Julius Edgar Lilienfeld =

20th-century electrical engineer and physicist (1882–1963)

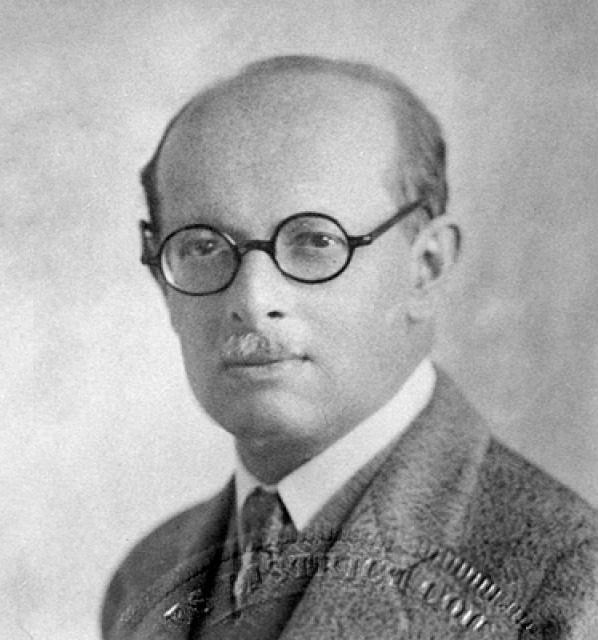
- Lilienfeld, c. 1934
- Born: April 18, 1882; Lemberg, Kingdom of Galicia and Lodomeria, Austria-Hungary
- Died: August 28, 1963 (aged 81); Saint Thomas, U.S. Virgin Islands
- Citizenship: Austria-Hungary (1882–1919); Poland (1919–1934); United States (1934–1963)
- Education: University of Berlin (PhD)
- Known for: Proposing the concept of the field-effect transistor
- Spouse: Beatrice Ginsburg (m. 1926)
- Scientific career
- Fields: Physics
- Workplaces: Leipzig University (1905–1926)
- Doctoral advisor: Max Planck; Emil Warburg
- Other academic advisors: Jacobus Henricus van 't Hoff

Signature
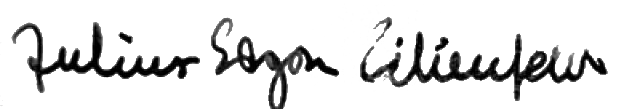

Julius Edgar Lilienfeld (April 18, 1882 – August 28, 1963) was an Austro-Hungarian, and later American (where he moved in 1921 and became a citizen in 1934) electrical engineer and physicist who has been credited with the first patent on the field-effect transistor in 1925. He was never able to build a working practical semiconductor device based on his concept. Additionally, because he didn't publish articles in learned journals and since high-purity semiconductor materials were not available to him, his FET patent never achieved fame, causing confusion for later inventors.

== Early life ==
Lilienfeld was born to a Jewish family in Lemberg (present-day Lviv) in the Austrian part of the Austro-Hungarian Empire. Lilienfeld's father was the lawyer Sigmund Lilienfeld, his mother Sarah Jampoler Lilienfeld.

== Education ==
After graduating high school in 1899, between 1900 and 1904, Lilienfeld studied at the Friedrich-Wilhelms-Universität (renamed Humboldt University in 1949), in Berlin, where he received his Ph.D. on February 18, 1905. In 1905, he started work at the physics institute at Leipzig University as an untenured professor.

== Career ==
Lilienfeld's early career, at the University of Leipzig, saw him conduct important early work on electrical discharges in "vacuum", between metal electrodes, from about 1910 onwards. His early passion was to clarify how this phenomenon changed as vacuum preparation techniques improved. More than any other scientist, he was responsible for the identification of field electron emission as a separate physical effect. (He called it "auto-electronic emission", and was interested in it as a possible electron source for miniaturised X-ray tubes, in medical applications.) Lilienfeld was responsible for the first reliable account in English of the experimental phenomenology of field electron emission, in 1922. The effect was explained by Fowler and Nordheim in 1928.

Lilienfeld moved to the United States in 1921 to pursue his patent claims, resigning his professorship at Leipzig to stay permanently in 1926. In 1928, he began working at Amrad in Malden, Massachusetts, later called Ergon Research Laboratories owned by Magnavox, which closed in 1935.

In the United States, Lilienfeld did research on anodic aluminum oxide films, patenting the electrolytic capacitor in 1931, the method continuing to be used throughout the century. He also invented a "FET-like" transistor, filing several patents describing the construction and operation of transistors, as well as many features of modern transistors. (US patent #1,745,175 for a FET-like transistor was granted January 28, 1930.) When Brattain, Bardeen, and their colleague chemist Robert Gibney tried to get patents on their earliest devices, most of their claims were rejected due to the Lilienfeld patents.

The optical radiation emitted when electrons strike a metal surface is named "Lilienfeld radiation" after he first discovered it close to X-ray tube anodes. Its origin is attributed to the excitation of plasmons in the metal surface.

The American Physical Society has named one of its major prizes after Lilienfeld.

== Personal life ==
Lilienfeld was a German-speaking Ashkenazi Jew who was a citizen of Austria-Hungary and later had dual citizenship in the United States and in Poland. He married an American, Beatrice Ginsburg, in New York City on May 2, 1926. They lived in Winchester, Massachusetts, where Lilienfeld was director of the Ergon Research Laboratories in Malden, becoming a United States citizen in 1934. After it closed in 1935, he and his wife built a house on St. Thomas in the U.S. Virgin Islands in hope of escaping an allergy associated with wheat fields, from which Lilienfeld had suffered for most of his life. Lilienfeld frequently traveled between St. Thomas and various mainland locations and continued to test new ideas and patent the resulting products.

== Patents ==
- US 1122011 "Process and apparatus for producing Roentgen rays" filed on 1912-10-02, describing an X-ray tube that produced x-rays from electrons emitted from a hot filament
- US 1218423 "Roentgen ray tube" filed on 1914-04-17, describing a refinement of his earlier X-ray tube that produced x-rays from electrons emitted from a hot filament
- US 1745175 "Method and apparatus for controlling electric current" first filed in Canada on 1925-10-22, describing a field-effect transistor
- US 1900018 "Device for controlling electric current" filed on 1928-03-28, a thin film field-effect transistor
- US 1877140 "Amplifier for electric currents" filed on 1928-12-08, solid state device where the current flow is controlled by a porous metal layer, a solid state version of the vacuum tube
- US 2013564 "Electrolytic condenser" filed on 1931-08-29, describing an electrolytic capacitor

== See also ==
- History of the transistor
- John Bertrand Johnson
- Oskar Heil
